This is a list of the moth species of the family Oecophoridae found in Australia. This list acts as an index to the species articles and forms part of the full List of moths of Australia.

Oecophorinae
Ancistromorpha phryganophanes (Turner, 1946)
Habroscopa idiocosma (Turner, 1898)
Habroscopa iriodes (Meyrick, 1883)
Habroscopa miltotypa (Turner, 1940)
Hapaloteucha idiosticha (Turner, 1917)
Hapaloteucha paragramma (Meyrick, 1884)
Hapaloteucha polemistis (Meyrick, 1902)
Lamproxantha camptosema (Turner, 1941)
Lamproxantha zorodes (Turner, 1939)
Leucorhabda macrosticha (Turner, 1939)
Leucorhabda rhododactyla (Turner, 1944)
Orthiastis hyperocha (Meyrick, 1884)
Polyeucta callimorpha (Lower, 1894)
Crepidosceles argyropis (Meyrick, 1902)
Crepidosceles chryserythra (Turner, 1894)
Crepidosceles coeloxantha (Turner, 1944)
Crepidosceles exanthema Meyrick, 1885
Crepidosceles glycydora (Turner, 1917)
Crepidosceles iostephana Meyrick, 1885
Crepidosceles leucodetis (Meyrick, 1888)
Crepidosceles orthomochla (Turner, 1944)
Crepidosceles proteis (Meyrick, 1888)
Crepidosceles rhodopechys (Turner, 1946)
Crepidosceles timalphes (Turner, 1917)
Lepidotarsa aclea (Meyrick, 1883)
Lepidotarsa allocota (Turner, 1944)
Lepidotarsa alphitella Meyrick, 1883
Lepidotarsa chrysopoca Meyrick, 1883
Lepidotarsa habrodelta (Lower, 1897)
Lepidotarsa maculopa (Lower, 1903)
Lepidotarsa nicetes Turner, 1946
Lepidotarsa pentascia Turner, 1917
Ageletha crocoxantha (Meyrick, 1888)
Ageletha elaeodes (Meyrick, 1883)
Ageletha hemiteles (Meyrick, 1883)
Anthocoma euterpnes Turner, 1946
Brachynemata aphanes (Meyrick, 1884)
Brachynemata cingulata Meyrick, 1885
Brachynemata diantha (Meyrick, 1913)
Brachynemata epiphragma (Meyrick, 1888)
Brachynemata ichneuta (Meyrick, 1888)
Brachynemata leucanepsia (Turner, 1940)
Brachynemata mimopa (Meyrick, 1902)
Brachynemata ochrolitha (Lower, 1903)
Brachynemata ombrodes (Lower, 1897)
Brachynemata restricta (Meyrick, 1920)
Coeranica eritima Meyrick, 1884
Coeranica isabella (Newman, 1856)
Coeranica rhythmosema (Turner, 1940)
Cosmaresta anarrecta (Meyrick, 1889)
Cosmaresta anomophanes (Turner, 1927)
Cosmaresta archedora (Turner, 1944)
Cosmaresta callichrysa (Lower, 1898)
Cosmaresta canephora (Meyrick, 1883)
Cosmaresta charaxias (Meyrick, 1889)
Cosmaresta eugramma (Lower, 1894)
Cosmaresta eurytoxa (Turner, 1944)
Cosmaresta hyphanta (Turner, 1927)
Cosmaresta leucozancla (Turner, 1944)
Cosmaresta niphias (Meyrick, 1884)
Cosmaresta ochrophara (Turner, 1938)
Cosmaresta phaeochorda (Turner, 1927)
Elaphromorpha asthenes (Turner, 1944)
Elaphromorpha axierasta (Turner, 1916)
Elaphromorpha euneta (Turner, 1940)
Elaphromorpha glycymilicha Turner, 1936
Eochrois acutella (Walker, 1864)
Eochrois aetopis (Meyrick, 1889)
Eochrois anaemica (Turner, 1916)
Eochrois anthophora (Turner, 1944)
Eochrois argyraspis (Lower, 1897)
Eochrois atypa (Turner, 1946)
Eochrois callianassa (Meyrick, 1883)
Eochrois caminias (Meyrick, 1889)
Eochrois chrysias (Lower, 1901)
Eochrois cuphosema (Turner, 1946)
Eochrois cycnodes (Meyrick, 1889)
Eochrois dejunctella (Walker, 1864)
Eochrois ebenosticha (Turner, 1917)
Eochrois epidesma (Meyrick, 1886)
Eochrois epitoxa (Meyrick, 1889)
Eochrois hebes (Turner, 1946)
Eochrois holarga (Turner, 1936)
Eochrois holochra (Turner, 1946)
Eochrois leiochroa Lower, 1907
Eochrois leucocrossa (Meyrick, 1889)
Eochrois malacopis (Meyrick, 1889)
Eochrois monophaes (Meyrick, 1884)
Eochrois pandora (Turner, 1917)
Eochrois phoenopis (Turner, 1940)
Eochrois platyphaea (Turner, 1939)
Eochrois pulverulenta (Meyrick, 1883)
Eochrois rubrilinea (Turner, 1947)
Eochrois sarcoxantha (Lower, 1893)
Heteroteucha anthodora (Meyrick, 1884)
Heteroteucha asema (Turner, 1917)
Heteroteucha aspasia (Meyrick, 1884)
Heteroteucha dichroella (Zeller, 1877)
Heteroteucha dimochla (Turner, 1944)
Heteroteucha distephana (Meyrick, 1884)
Heteroteucha epistrepta (Turner, 1940)
Heteroteucha initiata (Meyrick, 1920)
Heteroteucha kershawi (Lower, 1893)
Heteroteucha leptobaphes (Turner, 1944)
Heteroteucha occidua (Meyrick, 1884)
Heteroteucha ophthalmica (Meyrick, 1884)
Heteroteucha paraclista (Meyrick, 1913)
Heteroteucha parvula (Meyrick, 1884)
Heteroteucha porphyryplaca (Lower, 1893)
Heteroteucha rhoecosema (Turner, 1941)
Heteroteucha rhoecozona (Turner, 1946)
Heteroteucha stereomita (Turner, 1944)
Heteroteucha subflava (Turner, 1944)
Heteroteucha translatella (Walker, 1864)
Heteroteucha tritoxantha (Meyrick, 1886)
Heteroteucha xanthisma (Turner, 1917)
Lophopepla argyrocarpa Meyrick, 1914
Lophopepla asteropa (Lower, 1900)
Lophopepla igniferella (Walker, 1864)
Lophopepla triselena (Lower, 1902)
Piloprepes aemulella (Walker, 1864)
Piloprepes anassa Meyrick, 1889
Piloprepes anguicula Meyrick, 1913
Piloprepes antidoxa Meyrick, 1889
Piloprepes aristocratica Meyrick, 1889
Piloprepes gelidella (Walker, 1864)
Piloprepes glaucaspis Turner, 1896
Piloprepes perinephela (Turner, 1935)
Piloprepes polynephela (Turner, 1935)
Plectobela amphidyas (Meyrick, 1888)
Plectobela annularis (Meyrick, 1884)
Plectobela catalampra (Meyrick, 1884)
Plectobela ecliptica (Meyrick, 1884)
Plectobela ocellaris (Meyrick, 1884)
Plectobela personata (Meyrick, 1884)
Plectobela stereosema (Meyrick, 1889)
Plectobela zanclotoma (Meyrick, 1884)
Poliorhabda auriceps (Butler, 1882)
Poliorhabda chrysoptera (Turner, 1940)
Poliorhabda cnecopasta (Turner, 1941)
Poliorhabda phoenopasta (Turner, 1927)
Psaroxantha basilica (Meyrick, 1884)
Psaroxantha calligenes (Meyrick, 1886)
Psaroxantha calliphylla (Turner, 1917)
Psaroxantha epiplasta (Turner, 1917)
Psaroxantha euryzona (Turner, 1917)
Psaroxantha euzona (Turner, 1941)
Psaroxantha miltozona (Lower, 1901)
Psaroxantha polyzona (Turner, 1940)
Psaroxantha tricoronata (Meyrick, 1920)
Pycnozancla acribes (Turner, 1894)
Pycnozancla epiprepes (Turner, 1894)
Pycnozancla erythrodes Turner, 1917
Rhadinoloba euerata (Turner, 1940)
Rhadinoloba periculosa (Meyrick, 1913)
Rhadinoloba tyrianthina (Turner, 1940)
Saphezona pholidoxantha Common, 1994
Stictochila delosticta (Turner, 1946)
Stictochila metata (Meyrick, 1914)
Stictochila myriospila (Lower, 1903)
Stictochila sarcoptera (Lower, 1897)
Tanyzancla acutella (Walker, 1864)
Tanyzancla amphitoxa (Meyrick, 1889)
Tanyzancla argutella (Zeller, 1877)
Tanyzancla atricollis (Meyrick, 1884)
Tanyzancla calliophthalma (Meyrick, 1889)
Tanyzancla marionella (Newman, 1856)
Tanyzancla melanocrossa (Meyrick, 1889)
Tanyzancla phaedropa (Lower, 1901)
Zonopetala alypa (Turner, 1914)
Zonopetala clerota Meyrick, 1883
Zonopetala correcta Meyrick, 1915
Zonopetala decisana (Walker, 1863)
Zonopetala divisella (Walker, 1864)
Zonopetala glauconephela Meyrick, 1883
Zonopetala melanoma Meyrick, 1883
Zonopetala propria Turner, 1946
Zonopetala quadripustulella (Walker, 1864)
Zonopetala synarthra Meyrick, 1886
Zonopetala viscata Meyrick, 1914
Zonopetala zygophora Lower, 1894
Eremnotypa fusiplaga (Turner, 1917)
Eremnotypa steriphota (Meyrick, 1914)
Euphiltra angustior Turner, 1894
Euphiltra celeteria Turner, 1917
Euphiltra chrysorrhoda Meyrick, 1902
Euphiltra epilecta Turner, 1917
Euphiltra eroticella Meyrick, 1883
Euphiltra tricensa Meyrick, 1918
Euthictis xanthodelta (Meyrick, 1889)
Hoplomorpha abalienella (Walker, 1864)
Hoplomorpha camelaea (Meyrick, 1888)
Hoplomorpha caminodes Turner, 1916
Hoplomorpha epicosma Turner, 1916
Hoplomorpha notatana (Walker, 1863)
Hoplomorpha teratopa (Meyrick, 1920)
Placocosma agaclita (Meyrick, 1884)
Placocosma gemmaria (Meyrick, 1921)
Placocosma hemiphaes (Turner, 1917)
Placocosma hephaestea Meyrick, 1883
Placocosma resumptella (Walker, 1864)
Scotodryas alopecistis (Meyrick, 1889)
Scotodryas holocausta Turner, 1932
Scotodryas lechriosema (Turner, 1919)
Scotodryas lividella (Meyrick, 1883)
Ironopolia ebenosticta (Turner, 1946)
Ironopolia neochlora (Meyrick, 1883)
Ironopolia sobriella (Walker, 1864)
Ironopolia stygnodes (Turner, 1946)
Prodelaca achalinella (Meyrick, 1883)
Prodelaca biseriata (Meyrick, 1920)
Prodelaca eocrossa (Meyrick, 1888)
Prodelaca leptochroma (Turner, 1937)
Prodelaca limata (Meyrick, 1914)
Prodelaca micropasta (Turner, 1944)
Prodelaca myodes (Meyrick, 1883)
Prodelaca puellaris (Meyrick, 1883)
Basiplecta argyrodes (Turner, 1917)
Basiplecta plagiosticha (Turner, 1916)
Idiozancla pycnosticha Turner, 1936
Limothnes leucotoma Turner, 1935
Limothnes phaeodesma (Meyrick, 1913)
Limothnes plicilinea (Turner, 1935)
Linosticha chrysoloma Lower, 1893
Linosticha cyclophragma Meyrick, 1889
Linosticha epixesta Meyrick, 1889
Linosticha helictis Meyrick, 1889
Linosticha monozona Meyrick, 1889
Linosticha orthogramma (Meyrick, 1884)
Linosticha phaeoxysta (Turner, 1936)
Linosticha scythropa Meyrick, 1883
Psaltriodes thriambis Meyrick, 1902
Acmotoma magniferella (Walker, 1864)
Arachnographa mesophthora (Meyrick, 1886)
Arachnographa micrastrella (Meyrick, 1883)
Baiocystis chrysoides (Turner, 1917)
Baiocystis coniortia (Meyrick, 1884)
Echinobasis halata (Meyrick, 1913)
Echinobasis lactipalpis (Meyrick, 1920)
Echinobasis semifulva (Turner, 1944)
Epicurica laetiferanus (Walker, 1863)
Epicurica mutabilis (Turner, 1939)
Liocnema crypsirrhoda (Turner, 1939)
Paneutricha hypertricha (Turner, 1927)
Parocystola eubrocha (Turner, 1946)
Parocystola leucospora Turner, 1896
Phytotrypa anachorda (Meyrick, 1884)
Phytotrypa anazancla (Meyrick, 1889)
Phytotrypa brochosema (Meyrick, 1884)
Phytotrypa erythrotaenia (Wallengren, 1861)
Phytotrypa platyptera (Lower, 1893)
Phytotrypa pretiosella (Walker, 1863)
Phytotrypa propriella (Walker, 1864)
Acorotricha crystanta Meyrick, 1913
Acorotricha trichophora (Turner, 1917)
Callimima daedalma Turner, 1935
Callimima lophoptera (Lower, 1894)
Heteroptolis leucosta (Lower, 1892)
Hybocrossa paratypa Turner, 1917
Trachyzancla histrica Turner, 1917
Deigmoesta lithocosma (Meyrick, 1886)
Tortricopsis aulacois Meyrick, 1883
Tortricopsis crocopepla Turner, 1946
Tortricopsis euryphanella (Meyrick, 1883)
Tortricopsis hesychaea (Meyrick, 1886)
Tortricopsis pyroptis Meyrick, 1902
Tortricopsis semijunctella Walker, 1864
Tortricopsis uncinella (Zeller, 1854)
Wingia aurata (Walker, 1864)
Wingia hesperidella (Meyrick, 1883)
Wingia lambertella (Wing, 1850)
Wingia psittacodes (Turner, 1917)
Wingia rectiorella (Walker, 1864)
Wingia subrosea (Turner, 1894)
Wingia thalamia (Meyrick, 1883)
Wingia theophila (Meyrick, 1886)
Acanthodela erythrosema (Meyrick, 1886)
Acanthodela protophaes (Meyrick, 1883)
Ericibdela delotis (Meyrick, 1888)
Platyphylla zophosphena Turner, 1946
Ptyoptila matutinella (Walker, 1864)
Archaereta dorsivittella (Walker, 1863)
Enoplidia simplex (Turner, 1896)
Enoplidia stenomorpha (Turner, 1946)
Euchaetis coccoscela (Turner, 1946)
Euchaetis crypsichroa Lower, 1893
Euchaetis cryptorrhoda (Turner, 1946)
Euchaetis endoleuca Meyrick, 1888
Euchaetis euspilomela (Lower, 1893)
Euchaetis habrocosma Meyrick, 1883
Euchaetis holoclera Meyrick, 1888
Euchaetis incarnatella (Walker, 1864)
Euchaetis inceptella (Walker, 1864)
Euchaetis inclusella (Walker, 1864)
Euchaetis insana (Meyrick, 1921)
Euchaetis iospila Meyrick, 1888
Euchaetis iozona (Lower, 1893)
Euchaetis metallota Meyrick, 1883
Euchaetis parthenopa (Meyrick, 1883)
Euchaetis poliarcha Meyrick, 1888
Euchaetis rhizobola Meyrick, 1888
Euchaetis rhodochila (Turner, 1946)
Euchaetis rufogrisea (Meyrick, 1883)
Heliocausta floridula Meyrick, 1913
Heliocausta oecophorella (Walker, 1864)
Heliocausta sarcodes Turner, 1917
Prionocris acmaea (Meyrick, 1888)
Prionocris charodes (Lower, 1920)
Prionocris complanula (Turner, 1896)
Prionocris mollis (Turner, 1946)
Prionocris phylacopis (Meyrick, 1888)
Prionocris protoxantha (Meyrick, 1883)
Prionocris rhodopepla (Lower, 1903)
Syringoseca mimica (Meyrick, 1888)
Syringoseca rhodoxantha (Meyrick, 1888)
Antipterna acrobaphes (Meyrick, 1885)
Antipterna assulosa (Turner, 1940)
Antipterna diclethra (Meyrick, 1885)
Antipterna diplosticta (Turner, 1944)
Antipterna euanthes (Meyrick, 1885)
Antipterna glacialis (Meyrick, 1885)
Antipterna hemimelas (Turner, 1940)
Antipterna homoleuca (Meyrick, 1885)
Antipterna homopasta (Turner, 1932)
Antipterna lithophanes (Meyrick, 1885)
Antipterna microphanes (Lower, 1902)
Antipterna monostropha (Meyrick, 1885)
Antipterna naias (Meyrick, 1902)
Antipterna nivea (Turner, 1940)
Antipterna panarga (Turner, 1932)
Antipterna ptychomochla Turner, 1940
Antipterna spathulata (Turner, 1944)
Antipterna stichoptis (Lower, 1915)
Antipterna tephrodes (Lower, 1902)
Antipterna trilicella (Meyrick, 1885)
Atelosticha phaedrella Meyrick, 1883
Bathrosterra calotropha (Meyrick, 1883)
Bathrosterra gypsoplaca (Turner, 1944)
Bathrosterra macrotricha (Turner, 1917)
Catacometes hemiscia (Meyrick, 1883)
Catacometes phanozona (Turner, 1896)
Chrysonoma acnissa (Turner, 1940)
Chrysonoma bullifera Meyrick, 1920
Chrysonoma catoptrina (Meyrick, 1884)
Chrysonoma concisella (Walker, 1864)
Chrysonoma consularis (Meyrick, 1913)
Chrysonoma deltosema (Meyrick, 1884)
Chrysonoma drepanephora (Turner, 1944)
Chrysonoma epularis (Meyrick, 1913)
Chrysonoma euchrysa (Lower, 1894)
Chrysonoma fascialis (Fabricius, 1775)
Chrysonoma gilvella (Turner, 1917)
Chrysonoma habropis (Lower, 1897)
Chrysonoma ioplaca (Turner, 1944)
Chrysonoma iphia (Turner, 1940)
Chrysonoma isosceliphora (Lower, 1894)
Chrysonoma macropodias (Meyrick, 1913)
Chrysonoma megaloxantha (Turner, 1917)
Chrysonoma menodora (Meyrick, 1889)
Chrysonoma panxantha (Lower, 1894)
Chrysonoma paracycla (Meyrick, 1884)
Chrysonoma seleniaca (Meyrick, 1884)
Chrysonoma tentatella (Walker, 1864)
Chrysonoma toxeres (Turner, 1944)
Chrysonoma trigonocosma (Turner, 1941)
Chrysonoma xuthoterma (Meyrick, 1920)
Chrysonoma zanclotypa (Turner, 1917)
Compsotropha charidotis Meyrick, 1884
Compsotropha selenias Meyrick, 1884
Compsotropha strophiella Meyrick, 1884
Coryphoscola dictyosema (Turner, 1946)
Diaphorodes tephrastis (Turner, 1917)
Endeolena aurinatella (Walker, 1864)
Endeolena xanthiella (Walker, 1864)
Garrha absumptella (Walker, 1864)
Garrha achroa (Turner, 1896)
Garrha acosmeta (Turner, 1896)
Garrha agglomerata (Meyrick, 1920)
Garrha alma (Meyrick, 1914)
Garrha amata (Meyrick, 1914)
Garrha arrhodea (Turner, 1917)
Garrha atoecha (Meyrick, 1886)
Garrha atripunctatella (Turner, 1896)
Garrha brachytricha (Turner, 1927)
Garrha carnea (Zeller, 1855)
Garrha cholodella (Meyrick, 1883)
Garrha coccinea (Turner, 1917)
Garrha costimacula (Meyrick, 1883)
Garrha cylicotypa (Turner, 1946)
Garrha defessa (Meyrick, 1920)
Garrha demotica (Meyrick, 1883)
Garrha eugramma (Lower, 1894)
Garrha gypsopyga (Meyrick, 1914)
Garrha icasta (Turner, 1941)
Garrha idiosema (Turner, 1917)
Garrha interjecta (Turner, 1946)
Garrha leucerythra (Meyrick, 1883)
Garrha limbata (Meyrick, 1883)
Garrha mellichroa (Lower, 1897)
Garrha mesodesma (Meyrick, 1889)
Garrha mesogaea (Turner, 1916)
Garrha metriopis (Meyrick, 1888)
Garrha micromita (Turner, 1946)
Garrha miltopsara (Turner, 1914)
Garrha mitescens (Meyrick, 1914)
Garrha moderatella (Walker, 1864)
Garrha ocellifera (Meyrick, 1883)
Garrha ochra (Turner, 1946)
Garrha oncospila (Turner, 1946)
Garrha paraderces (Meyrick, 1889)
Garrha phaeoporphyra (Turner, 1939)
Garrha phoenopis (Turner, 1916)
Garrha platyporphyra (Turner, 1946)
Garrha pseudota (Lower, 1901)
Garrha pudica (Zeller, 1855)
Garrha pyrrhopasta (Turner, 1946)
Garrha repandula (Zeller, 1855)
Garrha rubella (Turner, 1939)
Garrha rufa (Meyrick, 1883)
Garrha rufescens (Turner, 1946)
Garrha rufimaculella (Turner, 1896)
Garrha sericata (Meyrick, 1883)
Garrha sincerella Walker, 1866
Garrha spatiosa (Meyrick, 1921)
Garrha submissa (Turner, 1946)
Garrha umbratica (Turner, 1946)
Garrha zonostola (Meyrick, 1884)
Hadrocheta syncarpica Common, 1994
Hemibela actinodes (Turner, 1940)
Hemibela bacchias (Meyrick, 1913)
Hemibela callista (Meyrick, 1885)
Hemibela gnomica (Meyrick, 1885)
Hemibela heliotricha (Lower, 1904)
Hemibela hemicalypta (Meyrick, 1885)
Hemibela oxyptera (Lower, 1894)
Hemibela platyxantha (Lower, 1907)
Hemibela pyrochrysa (Meyrick, 1889)
Hemibela spumifera (Turner, 1936)
Hemibela thymodes (Meyrick, 1885)
Hemibela trigonoptera (Turner, 1940)
Hemibela tyranna (Meyrick, 1885)
Idioxantha anthina (Turner, 1947)
Mionolena dolopis (Turner, 1941)
Mionolena euxantha (Meyrick, 1884)
Mionolena pleurophaea (Turner, 1940)
Myrascia bracteatella (Walker, 1864)
Myrascia chionora Common, 1977
Myrascia cremantis (Meyrick, 1889)
Myrascia empheres Common, 1977
Myrascia interlineatella (Walker, 1864)
Myrascia lathicentra (Meyrick, 1889)
Myrascia megalocentra (Meyrick, 1889)
Myrascia melitypa Common, 1977
Myrascia mychias (Meyrick, 1889)
Myrascia racinora Common, 1977
Myrascia subductella (Walker, 1864)
Myrascia trijugella (Zeller, 1877)
Ocystola chionea Meyrick, 1885
Ocystola crystallina Meyrick, 1885
Ocystola holonota Meyrick, 1889
Ocystola paulinella (Newman, 1856)
Ocystola pyramis Meyrick, 1885
Ocystola spectabilis (Turner, 1896)
Oligoloba severa (Meyrick, 1883)
Phyllophanes dyseureta Turner, 1896
Sclerocheta phyocera Common, 1994
Stereoloba diphracta (Lower, 1920)
Stereoloba melanoplecta (Turner, 1917)
Stereoloba promiscua (Meyrick, 1922)
Thalerotricha mylicella Meyrick, 1884
Zacorus albescens (Turner, 1944)
Zacorus anomodes (Meyrick, 1889)
Zacorus aparthena (Meyrick, 1884)
Zacorus carus Butler, 1882
Zacorus melanocentra (Meyrick, 1889)
Zacorus montivaga (Turner, 1939)
Zacorus pura (Meyrick, 1884)
Zelotechna falcifera (Meyrick, 1883)
Zelotechna hirax (Meyrick, 1883)
Zelotechna sigmastropha (Lower, 1898)
Phauloplana illuta (Meyrick, 1885)
Phauloplana xiphomorpha (Turner, 1940)
Pseudotheta syrtica (Meyrick, 1902)
Phauloglossa aspila Common, 1997
Phauloglossa palleuca Common, 1997
Brachyzancla acerasia (Turner, 1940)
Brachyzancla cretosa Turner, 1936
Brachyzancla lissodes Turner, 1936
Allognoma psephena (Meyrick, 1884)
Enchronista proximella (Walker, 1863)
Phloeograptis macrynta Meyrick, 1904
Phloeograptis obliquata (Lucas, 1900)
Phloeograptis pachnias (Meyrick, 1902)
Phloeograptis spodopasta (Lower, 1920)
Phloeograptis zopherota Meyrick, 1904
Proteromicta crymorrhoa Meyrick, 1889
Proteromicta spodostrota (Meyrick, 1902)
Ptochosaris brachyota (Meyrick, 1889)
Ptochosaris horrenda Meyrick, 1906
Heterozyga coppatias Meyrick, 1885
Aeolothapsa acrocosma (Turner, 1917)
Aeolothapsa agelaea (Meyrick, 1885)
Aeolothapsa isarithma (Meyrick, 1885)
Aeolothapsa malacella (Meyrick, 1885)
Aeolothapsa tanythrix (Turner, 1914)
Aeolothapsa xantholoma (Turner, 1917)
Artiastis heliacma Meyrick, 1889
Artiastis philoscia (Meyrick, 1902)
Artiastis ptochopa Meyrick, 1889
Artiastis stenopolia (Turner, 1936)
Artiastis tepida Meyrick, 1889
Atholosticta chalcoteucta (Turner, 1933)
Atholosticta oxypeuces (Turner, 1927)
Boroscena phaulopis Turner, 1917
Coesyra cyclotoma Meyrick, 1884
Coesyra mediocris Turner, 1941
Conobrosis acervata (Meyrick, 1914)
Conobrosis haplochroma Common, 1997
Cryptotypa ephalta (Meyrick, 1915)
Cryptotypa filifera (Turner, 1936)
Cryptotypa textilis (Meyrick, 1906)
Disselia aleurota Meyrick, 1886
Disselia iulophylla (Turner, 1933)
Drepanocera galbanea (Meyrick, 1913)
Drepanocera microstigmata (Turner, 1944)
Drepanocera torpens (Meyrick, 1920)
Erythrisa oenoessa Turner, 1938
Hesperoptila arida Meyrick, 1902
Hesperoptila capnopleura (Turner, 1936)
Hesperoptila lasiocephala (Lower, 1916)
Hesperoptila poliochroa (Turner, 1898)
Hesperoptila semidalota (Turner, 1936)
Ioptera aristogona Meyrick, 1883
Ioptera demica Meyrick, 1889
Oxythecta acceptella (Walker, 1864)
Oxythecta alternella (Walker, 1864)
Oxythecta gypsomera (Lower, 1920)
Oxythecta hieroglyphica Meyrick, 1885
Oxythecta loxomochla Turner, 1940
Oxythecta lygrosema Meyrick, 1885
Oxythecta nephelonota Meyrick, 1885
Oxythecta neurota (Meyrick, 1885)
Oxythecta zonoteles Meyrick, 1885
Pararsia marmorea (Lower, 1897)
Pelinoema pudica (Lower, 1900)
Pelinoema xipholeuca (Lower, 1901)
Periorycta eucraera (Turner, 1917)
Phloeocetis euthemon (Turner, 1936)
Phloeocetis leucospila (Meyrick, 1920)
Phloeocetis pissogramma (Turner, 1940)
Phloeocetis plagiospila (Lower, 1920)
Phloeocetis polycapna (Turner, 1917)
Phloeocetis psilostola (Meyrick, 1889)
Phloeocetis symmicta (Turner, 1936)
Phloeocetis virgea Turner, 1936
Pycnocera hypoxantha Turner, 1896
Scatochresis anadesma (Meyrick, 1889)
Scatochresis episema (Meyrick, 1883)
Scatochresis innumera (Meyrick, 1889)
Scatochresis perigrapta (Turner, 1933)
Stictopolia cretea (Turner, 1940)
Tachystola acroxantha (Meyrick, 1885)
Tachystola alphitopis (Turner, 1944)
Tachystola anthera (Meyrick, 1885)
Tachystola cerochyta (Turner, 1939)
Tachystola enoplia (Meyrick, 1885)
Tachystola hemisema (Meyrick, 1885)
Tachystola oxytora (Meyrick, 1885)
Tachystola phaeopyra (Turner, 1927)
Tachystola ptochodes (Turner, 1917)
Tachystola sidonia (Meyrick, 1913)
Tachystola stenoptera (Meyrick, 1884)
Tachystola thiasotis (Meyrick, 1885)
Telanepsia astatopis (Turner, 1933)
Telanepsia coprobora Common & Horak, 1994
Telanepsia eucentra (Turner, 1927)
Telanepsia idiospila (Turner, 1933)
Telanepsia mobilis (Meyrick, 1915)
Telanepsia niphadia (Meyrick, 1886)
Telanepsia nonymopis (Turner, 1933)
Telanepsia notospila (Turner, 1933)
Telanepsia oricalla Turner, 1933
Telanepsia scatophila Common & Horak, 1994
Telanepsia stenophanes (Turner, 1933)
Telanepsia stictocrossa (Turner, 1939)
Telanepsia stockeri Common & Horak, 1994
Telanepsia suppressella (Walker, 1864)
Telanepsia tholopa (Turner, 1916)
Telanepsia tidbinbilla Common & Horak, 1994
Telanepsia trivialis (Meyrick, 1914)
Ascetoloba lochmaea (Turner, 1917)
Chezala aleurias Turner, 1917
Chezala anaxia Turner, 1941
Chezala aterpna Turner, 1941
Chezala brachypepla (Meyrick, 1883)
Chezala carella (Walker, 1864)
Chezala carphalea (Meyrick, 1884)
Chezala carphodes Turner, 1941
Chezala cataxera (Meyrick, 1884)
Chezala conjunctella (Walker, 1864)
Chezala crypsileuca (Meyrick, 1884)
Chezala erythrastis (Meyrick, 1889)
Chezala fulvia (Butler, 1882)
Chezala galactina (Turner, 1916)
Chezala glaphyropla (Meyrick, 1884)
Chezala isocycla Meyrick, 1922
Chezala leparga (Turner, 1917)
Chezala liquida (Meyrick, 1914)
Chezala lucens Meyrick, 1915
Chezala micranepsia (Turner, 1927)
Chezala minyra (Meyrick, 1914)
Chezala ochrobapta Lower, 1920
Chezala osteochroa (Turner, 1898)
Chezala privatella (Walker, 1864)
Chezala silvestris Turner, 1917
Chezala torva Turner, 1941
Hadrognatha aetodes (Meyrick, 1889)
Tanycaula acrophaea (Turner, 1916)
Tanycaula ombrophora (Meyrick, 1883)
Tanycaula platycapna (Turner, 1940)
Tanycaula plesiosticta (Turner, 1938)
Tanycaula semidalis (Turner, 1936)
Cnecophora cinetica (Meyrick, 1884)
Cnecophora melichrodes (Turner, 1898)
Cnecophora rasilis (Turner, 1927)
Diapatela placina (Turner, 1939)
Diapatela semophanes (Meyrick, 1889)
Diapatela thiopepla (Turner, 1939)
Dissoloba caseicolor (Turner, 1944)
Dissoloba cirrhodes (Meyrick, 1913)
Dissoloba iochalca (Meyrick, 1886)
Dissoloba ochrochoa (Lower, 1894)
Prepalla anthracina (Turner, 1917)
Prepalla cnephaea (Meyrick, 1889)
Prepalla leucophlebia (Turner, 1941)
Prepalla neurotenes (Turner, 1939)
Prepalla phloeomima (Turner, 1939)
Prepalla picea (Turner, 1939)
Prepalla tephrina (Meyrick, 1884)
Thema acratopa (Turner, 1939)
Thema agastopis (Turner, 1939)
Thema argoptera (Meyrick, 1884)
Thema brevivitella Walker, 1864
Thema chlorochyta (Meyrick, 1884)
Thema endesma (Meyrick, 1884)
Thema epiclines (Turner, 1939)
Thema epitripta (Turner, 1917)
Thema gypsina (Meyrick, 1884)
Thema gypsosema (Turner, 1917)
Thema holoxesta (Meyrick, 1889)
Thema leucophara (Turner, 1914)
Thema lomographa (Lower, 1902)
Thema macroscia (Meyrick, 1889)
Thema peloxantha (Meyrick, 1884)
Thema protogramma (Meyrick, 1884)
Thema proxima (Turner, 1939)
Thema psammoxantha (Meyrick, 1884)
Thema stasiastica (Meyrick, 1884)
Thema xiphochrysa (Lower, 1905)
Ericrypsina chorodoxa (Meyrick, 1920)
Ericrypsina ductaria (Meyrick, 1913)
Ericrypsina megalophanes Turner, 1938
Acantholena acedesta (Turner, 1938)
Acantholena dysaethria (Turner, 1938)
Acantholena hiemalis (Meyrick, 1914)
Acantholena siccella (Walker, 1864)
Acedesta picicolor Turner, 1940
Anomozancla scopariella (Walker, 1864)
Delexocha ochrocausta (Meyrick, 1884)
Epithymema amechana (Turner, 1944)
Epithymema borborodes (Turner, 1917)
Epithymema chrysocolla (Turner, 1896)
Epithymema chrysopis (Meyrick, 1902)
Epithymema crocias (Turner, 1941)
Epithymema disparile Turner, 1914
Epithymema gennaea (Turner, 1939)
Epithymema helias (Meyrick, 1884)
Epithymema idiophanes (Turner, 1941)
Epithymema incomposita (Meyrick, 1884)
Epithymema mimetis (Turner, 1917)
Epithymema oridroma (Turner, 1940)
Epithymema parile Turner, 1935
Epithymema proselia (Turner, 1917)
Epithymema tyrodes (Turner, 1938)
Leistomorpha brontoscopa Meyrick, 1884
Merocroca automima (Meyrick, 1889)
Nephogenes abditella (Walker, 1863)
Nephogenes achroa (Meyrick, 1914)
Nephogenes desiccata (Meyrick, 1915)
Nephogenes didymospila (Turner, 1936)
Nephogenes graphica (Meyrick, 1888)
Nephogenes melanoptila (Meyrick, 1883)
Nephogenes mochlastis (Meyrick, 1888)
Nephogenes philopsamma Meyrick, 1883
Notodryas aeria Meyrick, 1897
Notodryas callierga Meyrick, 1906
Notodryas encrita (Lower, 1920)
Notodryas vallata Meyrick, 1897
Olbonoma asthenopis (Meyrick, 1889)
Olbonoma callopistis (Meyrick, 1913)
Olbonoma disticta (Turner, 1917)
Olbonoma heliciotis (Turner, 1940)
Olbonoma heterozona (Lower, 1894)
Olbonoma leptospila (Meyrick, 1889)
Olbonoma melliflua (Meyrick, 1884)
Olbonoma plagiomochla (Turner, 1944)
Olbonoma staitina Turner, 1940
Olbonoma stenomita (Turner, 1944)
Olbonoma thermistis (Meyrick, 1889)
Olbonoma triptycha (Meyrick, 1884)
Olenacantha egelida (Meyrick, 1883)
Olenacantha parasema (Lower, 1920)
Olenacantha tephropolia (Turner, 1938)
Pantogymna themeropis (Meyrick, 1884)
Pantogymna titanitis (Turner, 1927)
Pantogymna zalocoma (Meyrick, 1884)
Parergophela apricata (Meyrick, 1913)
Parergophela ataurota (Turner, 1941)
Parergophela crocobapta (Meyrick, 1884)
Parergophela melirrhoa (Meyrick, 1884)
Parergophela monadelta (Lower, 1897)
Parergophela (Turner, 1941)
Pellopsis aerodes (Meyrick, 1883)
Phryganeutis cinerea Meyrick, 1884
Platoloncha coniata (Meyrick, 1885)
Platoloncha milichia (Meyrick, 1885)
Platoloncha psamathina (Meyrick, 1885)
Satrapia thesaurina Meyrick, 1886
Trichomoeris amphichrysa Meyrick, 1913
Trichomoeris heterochrysa Meyrick, 1922
Ataleida lacteola (Turner, 1939)
Endrosis sarcitrella (Linnaeus, 1758)
Hofmannophila pseudospretella (Stainton, 1849)
Macrophara aneureta (Turner, 1946)
Trisyntopa euryspoda Lower, 1918
Trisyntopa scatophaga (White, 1922)
Diplogephyra amblyteles (Meyrick, 1889)
Diplogephyra cyrtoloma (Turner, 1936)
Diplogephyra sciophanes (Meyrick, 1883)
Echinocosma catachrysa (Meyrick, 1889)
Eusemocosma pruinosa (Meyrick, 1884)
Gymnocoila callimeris (Meyrick, 1888)
Gymnocoila cataplasta (Meyrick, 1888)
Gymnocoila elaeota (Meyrick, 1888)
Gymnocoila glaphyrota (Meyrick, 1888)
Gymnocoila xanthocrossa (Meyrick, 1888)
Haplodyta alloea (Turner, 1944)
Haplodyta anisochroa (Turner, 1944)
Haplodyta brachyomis (Meyrick, 1889)
Haplodyta disema (Meyrick, 1884)
Haplodyta lithochlora (Meyrick, 1889)
Haplodyta noserodes (Meyrick, 1889)
Haplodyta panxantha (Meyrick, 1884)
Haplodyta polybotrya (Turner, 1917)
Haplodyta thoracta Meyrick, 1886
Isomoralla amylodes (Meyrick, 1884)
Isomoralla causta (Turner, 1944)
Isomoralla crocodes (Turner, 1944)
Isomoralla curriculata (Meyrick, 1920)
Isomoralla eriscota (Meyrick, 1889)
Isomoralla eucista (Turner, 1917)
Isomoralla gephyrota (Meyrick, 1884)
Isomoralla melanomita (Turner, 1944)
Isomoralla omichlota (Meyrick, 1884)
Isomoralla philotherma (Meyrick, 1883)
Isomoralla pyrrhoptera (Meyrick, 1884)
Isomoralla silacea (Turner, 1917)
Isomoralla triplectis (Meyrick, 1913)
Microbela allocoma Meyrick, 1885
Microbela epicona Meyrick, 1885
Microbela monodyas Meyrick, 1885
Microbela xanthopepla (Turner, 1944)
Palimmeces adoxella (Meyrick, 1883)
Palimmeces amaura (Meyrick, 1883)
Palimmeces amauropis (Turner, 1938)
Palimmeces amissella (Walker, 1864)
Palimmeces amphileuca (Lower, 1903)
Palimmeces autophaia Common, 1996
Palimmeces centrotona (Meyrick, 1915)
Palimmeces concolor (Turner, 1898)
Palimmeces difficilis (Turner, 1939)
Palimmeces frigescens (Meyrick, 1913)
Palimmeces glaberrima (Turner, 1936)
Palimmeces gypsota (Lower, 1893)
Palimmeces habrophanes (Meyrick, 1883)
Palimmeces hemiphanes (Meyrick, 1883)
Palimmeces heptarcha (Meyrick, 1889)
Palimmeces holopsara (Turner, 1937)
Palimmeces homophanes (Turner, 1937)
Palimmeces ithysticha Turner, 1916
Palimmeces leucomitra (Meyrick, 1884)
Palimmeces leucopelta (Meyrick, 1883)
Palimmeces monolitha (Meyrick, 1884)
Palimmeces nephobola (Turner, 1937)
Palimmeces percna (Turner, 1938)
Palimmeces petrophanes (Meyrick, 1914)
Palimmeces phoryntis (Meyrick, 1902)
Palimmeces poecilella (Meyrick, 1883)
Palimmeces psarophanes (Turner, 1916)
Palimmeces pseudomorpha (Turner, 1937)
Palimmeces pycnographa (Turner, 1916)
Palimmeces stephanota (Turner, 1937)
Palimmeces synchroa (Turner, 1916)
Palimmeces variegata (Meyrick, 1883)
Palimmeces vernilis (Turner, 1933)
Palimmeces vicina (Turner, 1916)
Philobota abductella (Walker, 1864)
Philobota aceraea (Meyrick, 1883)
Philobota acerba (Turner, 1939)
Philobota achranta (Turner, 1917)
Philobota acompsa (Turner, 1939)
Philobota acropola Meyrick, 1884
Philobota actias (Lower, 1899)
Philobota aedophanes Turner, 1944
Philobota aethalea (Meyrick, 1883)
Philobota agnesella (Newman, 1856)
Philobota agrapha Turner, 1917
Philobota amblopis Turner, 1944
Philobota amblys Turner, 1944
Philobota ameles Turner, 1944
Philobota ancylotoxa Meyrick, 1884
Philobota angustella (Walker, 1864)
Philobota apora (Meyrick, 1883)
Philobota arabella (Newman, 1856)
Philobota archepeda (Meyrick, 1888)
Philobota argotoxa Meyrick, 1889
Philobota asemantica (Turner, 1944)
Philobota atmobola Meyrick, 1884
Philobota atmopis (Meyrick, 1889)
Philobota atrisignis (Lower, 1900)
Philobota austalea (Meyrick, 1884)
Philobota auxolyca Meyrick, 1889
Philobota baryptera (Turner, 1896)
Philobota barysoma (Meyrick, 1883)
Philobota basicapna (Turner, 1937)
Philobota basiphaia Common, 1996
Philobota bathrogramma (Turner, 1916)
Philobota bathrophaea (Turner, 1914)
Philobota biophora Meyrick, 1884
Philobota brachystoma (Meyrick, 1915)
Philobota byrsochra (Meyrick, 1915)
Philobota calamaea Meyrick, 1884
Philobota callistis (Meyrick, 1889)
Philobota candida (Turner, 1898)
Philobota capnonota (Turner, 1938)
Philobota catharopa Turner, 1944
Philobota celaenopa (Turner, 1936)
Philobota centromita Turner, 1944
Philobota cephalochrysa (Lower, 1894)
Philobota chionoptera Meyrick, 1884
Philobota chlorella (Meyrick, 1883)
Philobota chrysopotama Meyrick, 1884
Philobota cirrhocephala (Turner, 1917)
Philobota cirrhopepla (Turner, 1916)
Philobota clastosticha (Turner, 1939)
Philobota cnecopasta (Turner, 1937)
Philobota comarcha (Meyrick, 1920)
Philobota cosmocrates Meyrick, 1889
Philobota crassinervis (Lower, 1900)
Philobota cretacea Meyrick, 1884
Philobota crocopleura Turner, 1944
Philobota crossoxantha (Lower, 1907)
Philobota crypsichola Meyrick, 1884
Philobota cryptea (Turner, 1938)
Philobota curvilinea (Turner, 1896)
Philobota cyphocentra (Meyrick, 1922)
Philobota dedecorata Meyrick, 1915
Philobota delochorda (Turner, 1917)
Philobota delosema Turner, 1917
Philobota delosticha (Lower, 1915)
Philobota deltoloma (Lower, 1923)
Philobota diaereta Turner, 1917
Philobota dichotoma (Turner, 1941)
Philobota dictyodes (Meyrick, 1889)
Philobota dysphorata (Turner, 1938)
Philobota egena (Turner, 1940)
Philobota ellenella (Newman, 1856)
Philobota embologramma (Turner, 1916)
Philobota enchalca Turner, 1917
Philobota ennephela (Meyrick, 1883)
Philobota epibosca (Turner, 1937)
Philobota epipercna (Turner, 1917)
Philobota erebodes Meyrick, 1884
Philobota eremosema Lower, 1915
Philobota eremotropha (Turner, 1938)
Philobota euarmosta Turner, 1944
Philobota euchlora (Turner, 1896)
Philobota euethira (Turner, 1944)
Philobota euzancla (Turner, 1938)
Philobota foedatella (Walker, 1864)
Philobota fumifera (Turner, 1939)
Philobota futilis Meyrick, 1920
Philobota glaucoptera Meyrick, 1884
Philobota gonostropha Lower, 1896
Philobota grammatica (Meyrick, 1883)
Philobota haplogramma (Turner, 1917)
Philobota haplostola (Turner, 1937)
Philobota hemera (Meyrick, 1886)
Philobota hemichrysa (Lower, 1916)
Philobota heptasticta (Turner, 1937)
Philobota heterophaea Turner, 1944
Philobota hexasticta (Turner, 1937)
Philobota hiracistis Meyrick, 1889
Philobota homochroa (Turner, 1916)
Philobota homophyla (Turner, 1937)
Philobota humerella (Walker, 1863)
Philobota hydara Meyrick, 1884
Philobota hylophila (Turner, 1917)
Philobota hypocausta Meyrick, 1884
Philobota hypopolia (Turner, 1917)
Philobota ignava Meyrick, 1913
Philobota immemor (Meyrick, 1913)
Philobota impletella (Walker, 1869)
Philobota incompta Turner, 1944
Philobota iphigenes Meyrick, 1889
Philobota ischnodes (Meyrick, 1902)
Philobota ischnophanes (Turner, 1937)
Philobota isonoma Common, 1996
Philobota latifissella (Walker, 1864)
Philobota laxeuta (Meyrick, 1913)
Philobota leptochorda (Turner, 1916)
Philobota leucodelta (Turner, 1938)
Philobota limenarcha Meyrick, 1913
Philobota lochmaula (Turner, 1917)
Philobota lonchota Turner, 1896
Philobota lutulenta (Meyrick, 1913)
Philobota lysizona Meyrick, 1889
Philobota macrostola (Turner, 1938)
Philobota marcens Meyrick, 1914
Philobota mathematica (Meyrick, 1883)
Philobota melanoglypta Meyrick, 1889
Philobota melanogypsa (Turner, 1938)
Philobota melanoxantha Meyrick, 1889
Philobota melanthes (Lower, 1899)
Philobota meraca (Turner, 1937)
Philobota metaxantha (Turner, 1941)
Philobota microxantha Meyrick, 1889
Philobota moestella (Walker, 1864)
Philobota monogramma Meyrick, 1884
Philobota monoides (Turner, 1917)
Philobota monospila (Turner, 1937)
Philobota mucida (Turner, 1938)
Philobota myrochrista (Meyrick, 1920)
Philobota napaea (Turner, 1917)
Philobota nephelarcha Meyrick, 1884
Philobota nephelota Turner, 1944
Philobota obliviosa Meyrick, 1913
Philobota ochlophila (Turner, 1938)
Philobota olympias Meyrick, 1889
Philobota omotypa Turner, 1944
Philobota orecta (Turner, 1938)
Philobota orescoa (Meyrick, 1883)
Philobota orinoma Meyrick, 1884
Philobota ortholoma (Turner, 1937)
Philobota orthomita Turner, 1917
Philobota orthotoma Turner, 1917
Philobota oxyptila (Turner, 1937)
Philobota pachychorda (Turner, 1937)
Philobota pacifera (Meyrick, 1914)
Philobota paragypsa Lower, 1900
Philobota partitella (Walker, 1864)
Philobota pasteoptera (Turner, 1937)
Philobota pedetis Meyrick, 1884
Philobota perangusta (Turner, 1936)
Philobota perioeca (Turner, 1937)
Philobota perixantha Turner, 1896
Philobota perpetua (Meyrick, 1913)
Philobota petrinodes (Lower, 1901)
Philobota phaeodelta (Turner, 1937)
Philobota philostaura (Meyrick, 1883)
Philobota phlaura (Turner, 1938)
Philobota physaula Meyrick, 1914
Philobota pilidiota (Turner, 1917)
Philobota pilipes (Butler, 1882)
Philobota placophaea (Turner, 1937)
Philobota plesiosperma (Turner, 1937)
Philobota pleurosticha (Turner, 1936)
Philobota plicilinea (Turner, 1938)
Philobota polypenthes (Turner, 1939)
Philobota prepodes (Turner, 1937)
Philobota productella (Walker, 1864)
Philobota profuga (Meyrick, 1913)
Philobota proscedes (Turner, 1936)
Philobota protecta Meyrick, 1920
Philobota protorthra (Meyrick, 1883)
Philobota psacasta (Meyrick, 1883)
Philobota psammochroa (Lower, 1894)
Philobota publicana (Meyrick, 1914)
Philobota pulvifera (Turner, 1937)
Philobota pycnoda (Lower, 1907)
Philobota pyrota (Meyrick, 1889)
Philobota rhadinosticha (Turner, 1938)
Philobota rhipidura (Meyrick, 1913)
Philobota ruinosa (Meyrick, 1913)
Philobota scieropa Meyrick, 1889
Philobota scioessa (Turner, 1938)
Philobota scitula (Turner, 1917)
Philobota semantica (Turner, 1916)
Philobota silignias (Lower, 1899)
Philobota similis (Turner, 1937)
Philobota sophia Turner, 1896
Philobota sordidella (Walker, 1864)
Philobota sphenoleuca Lower, 1907
Philobota spodotis Turner, 1944
Philobota stella (Newman, 1856)
Philobota stenophylla (Turner, 1939)
Philobota stenotypa (Turner, 1917)
Philobota sthenopis Turner, 1927
Philobota stictoloma (Turner, 1944)
Philobota stramentaria (Turner, 1916)
Philobota strigatella (Donovan, 1805)
Philobota strongyla (Turner, 1936)
Philobota susanae (Lower, 1900)
Philobota syncolla (Turner, 1917)
Philobota syneches (Turner, 1914)
Philobota synnephes (Turner, 1937)
Philobota tanyscia (Meyrick, 1883)
Philobota thiobaphes (Turner, 1937)
Philobota thiocrossa (Turner, 1917)
Philobota thiogramma Meyrick, 1889
Philobota tranquilla (Turner, 1937)
Philobota transversella (Walker, 1864)
Philobota trigonosema (Turner, 1937)
Philobota xanthastis (Meyrick, 1889)
Philobota xanthodisca Turner, 1944
Philobota xanthopolia (Turner, 1941)
Philobota xanthoprepes Turner, 1917
Philobota xerodes (Lower, 1900)
Philobota xipheres Turner, 1896
Philobota xiphopepla (Lower, 1920)
Philobota xiphostola Meyrick, 1884
Philobota xuthocrana (Turner, 1937)
Philobota xylochroa (Lower, 1893)
Philobota zalias (Lower, 1899)
Prepocosma achylopa (Turner, 1936)
Prepocosma acibdela (Turner, 1940)
Prepocosma aplasta (Meyrick, 1914)
Prepocosma argochroa (Turner, 1936)
Prepocosma asthenospila (Turner, 1936)
Prepocosma ataurota (Turner, 1944)
Prepocosma byssodes (Turner, 1940)
Prepocosma commoda (Turner, 1936)
Prepocosma consimilis (Turner, 1936)
Prepocosma cycnoptera (Meyrick, 1888)
Prepocosma eriopa (Lower, 1900)
Prepocosma haplopa (Turner, 1940)
Prepocosma homomorpha (Turner, 1940)
Prepocosma hylobita (Turner, 1917)
Prepocosma hyperleuca (Turner, 1940)
Prepocosma innocens (Meyrick, 1913)
Prepocosma leptogramma (Turner, 1936)
Prepocosma megalospora (Turner, 1936)
Prepocosma melanospora (Meyrick, 1886)
Prepocosma micropasta (Turner, 1940)
Prepocosma modica (Turner, 1916)
Prepocosma pallidula (Turner, 1936)
Prepocosma pediaula (Turner, 1938)
Prepocosma phaeostephes (Meyrick, 1888)
Prepocosma puncta (Turner, 1947)
Prepocosma schalidota (Meyrick, 1888)
Prepocosma subtilis (Turner, 1940)
Prepocosma tropica (Meyrick, 1888)
Prodelodes samphoras (Meyrick, 1886)
Stereocheta gummosa (Meyrick, 1913)
Stereocheta ocularis (Turner, 1896)
Stereocheta poliocrossa (Turner, 1944)
Stereocheta sciocrossa (Meyrick, 1913)
Telocharacta hemicroca (Lower, 1903)
Telocharacta metachroa (Meyrick, 1889)
Acolasta brachysticha (Turner, 1935)
Acolasta rhabdora (Turner, 1937)
Acolasta scolia Meyrick, 1902
Aristeis chrysoteuches Meyrick, 1884
Aristeis hepialella (Walker, 1864)
Aristeis niphodisca (Turner, 1940)
Atheropla barytypa Turner, 1939
Atheropla bathroxantha (Turner, 1939)
Atheropla calamaea (Turner, 1935)
Atheropla chorias Meyrick, 1902
Atheropla crocea Turner, 1939
Atheropla decaspila Meyrick, 1889
Atheropla dolichotricha (Turner, 1927)
Atheropla esthlopis (Turner, 1917)
Atheropla fumosa Turner, 1927
Atheropla hemispila (Meyrick, 1889)
Atheropla melichlora Meyrick, 1884
Atheropla nigricincta (Meyrick, 1921)
Atheropla psammodes (Turner, 1898)
Atheropla psilopis Meyrick, 1889
Atheropla scioxantha Lower, 1902
Atheropla triplaca (Meyrick, 1902)
Diplogrypa microptera (Turner, 1916)
Eulechria absona (Turner, 1917)
Eulechria aclina (Turner, 1932)
Eulechria acrotropa (Meyrick, 1884)
Eulechria adoxodes (Turner, 1933)
Eulechria ancyrota (Meyrick, 1883)
Eulechria aphaura Meyrick, 1888
Eulechria arctans (T.P. Lucas, 1900)
Eulechria argolina (Meyrick, 1889)
Eulechria atmospila Turner, 1916
Eulechria auantis (Meyrick, 1889)
Eulechria aureola (Turner, 1898)
Eulechria autographa (Meyrick, 1902)
Eulechria balanota (Meyrick, 1889)
Eulechria basiplaga (Walker, 1863)
Eulechria callidesma (Lower, 1894)
Eulechria capsellata Meyrick, 1913
Eulechria catharistis Turner, 1916
Eulechria ceratina (Meyrick, 1884)
Eulechria ceratochroa Lower, 1920
Eulechria chersomicta (Meyrick, 1920)
Eulechria chionospila (Turner, 1941)
Eulechria chrysodeta (Turner, 1941)
Eulechria chrysomochla Turner, 1937
Eulechria chrysozona (Turner, 1896)
Eulechria clytophanes (Turner, 1941)
Eulechria cocytias (Meyrick, 1915)
Eulechria contentella (Walker, 1864)
Eulechria convictella (Walker, 1864)
Eulechria corsota Meyrick, 1914
Eulechria delicia (Turner, 1917)
Eulechria delospila Turner, 1916
Eulechria delosticta (Turner, 1944)
Eulechria diacrita (Turner, 1917)
Eulechria diaphanes Turner, 1898
Eulechria diasticha Turner, 1937
Eulechria dichroa (Lower, 1893)
Eulechria diploclethra Turner, 1916
Eulechria drosocapna Meyrick, 1920
Eulechria dysimera Turner, 1938
Eulechria electrodes (Meyrick, 1884)
Eulechria empheres Turner, 1938
Eulechria encratodes Meyrick, 1922
Eulechria epicausta Meyrick, 1883
Eulechria epimicta (Meyrick, 1886)
Eulechria eremnopa (Turner, 1917)
Eulechria eriphila Meyrick, 1888
Eulechria euadelpha (Lower, 1901)
Eulechria eucrita (Turner, 1917)
Eulechria eurycneca Turner, 1937
Eulechria eurygramma Turner, 1916
Eulechria exanimis Meyrick, 1883
Eulechria flavipuncta (Turner, 1933)
Eulechria gypsochroa Turner, 1937
Eulechria habrosema (Turner, 1944)
Eulechria haplopepla Turner, 1938
Eulechria haplophara (Turner, 1915)
Eulechria haplopolia Turner, 1938
Eulechria haplosticta Turner, 1938
Eulechria heliocoma Meyrick, 1888
Eulechria heliodora Meyrick, 1888
Eulechria heliophanes (Lower, 1894)
Eulechria hemiochra (Turner, 1935)
Eulechria hemisphaerica (Meyrick, 1886)
Eulechria hilda (Turner, 1917)
Eulechria holodascia Turner, 1938
Eulechria homochra Turner, 1938
Eulechria homopela (Turner, 1933)
Eulechria homophyes (Turner, 1941)
Eulechria homospora Meyrick, 1913
Eulechria homotona (Meyrick, 1884)
Eulechria hymenaea Meyrick, 1902
Eulechria ischnota (Lower, 1903)
Eulechria isogramma (Meyrick, 1884)
Eulechria isozona (Lower, 1901)
Eulechria leptobela Meyrick, 1883
Eulechria leptocneca (Turner, 1933)
Eulechria leptopasta Turner, 1938
Eulechria leptosema Common, 1996
Eulechria lissophanes Turner, 1938
Eulechria lissopolia (Turner, 1927)
Eulechria lunata (Turner, 1896)
Eulechria malacoptera Meyrick, 1888
Eulechria malacostola (Turner, 1941)
Eulechria marmorata (Meyrick, 1889)
Eulechria mechanica (Meyrick, 1889)
Eulechria melanoploca (Meyrick, 1884)
Eulechria melesella (Newman, 1856)
Eulechria metacroca (Turner, 1944)
Eulechria metarga (Turner, 1939)
Eulechria micranepsia Turner, 1938
Eulechria microschema (Meyrick, 1883)
Eulechria modesta (Turner, 1944)
Eulechria nephelella (Turner, 1898)
Eulechria niphobola Lower, 1920
Eulechria omosema Meyrick, 1920
Eulechria ophiodes (Meyrick, 1889)
Eulechria orbitalis Meyrick, 1922
Eulechria orbitosa Meyrick, 1920
Eulechria orestera (Turner, 1917)
Eulechria orgiastis (Meyrick, 1889)
Eulechria oxytona (Turner, 1916)
Eulechria pallidella Meyrick, 1883
Eulechria pantelella Meyrick, 1883
Eulechria pastea (Turner, 1927)
Eulechria paurophylla (Turner, 1916)
Eulechria pentamera (Lower, 1893)
Eulechria pentatypa (Turner, 1941)
Eulechria perdita Meyrick, 1883
Eulechria periphanes (Turner, 1944)
Eulechria permeata (Meyrick, 1913)
Eulechria phaeina (Turner, 1896)
Eulechria phoenissa Meyrick, 1902
Eulechria pissograpta Turner, 1938
Eulechria platyrrhabda Turner, 1937
Eulechria polioleuca (Turner, 1933)
Eulechria psaritis (Turner, 1933)
Eulechria psilopla (Meyrick, 1884)
Eulechria pulverea (Meyrick, 1884)
Eulechria pyrgophora (Turner, 1941)
Eulechria rhymodes Meyrick, 1914
Eulechria sciosticha (Turner, 1941)
Eulechria sigmophora (Meyrick, 1884)
Eulechria sphaeroides (Turner, 1896)
Eulechria sphodra (Turner, 1941)
Eulechria spreta Turner, 1939
Eulechria stadiota (Meyrick, 1889)
Eulechria stigmatophora Turner, 1896
Eulechria stoechodes (Turner, 1936)
Eulechria subpunctella (Walker, 1864)
Eulechria suffusa (Turner, 1936)
Eulechria symbleta (Turner, 1914)
Eulechria syngenes (Turner, 1941)
Eulechria tephrochroa Turner, 1916
Eulechria theorica (Meyrick, 1884)
Eulechria thermochroa (Meyrick, 1884)
Eulechria theticophara Turner, 1938
Eulechria threnodes Turner, 1916
Eulechria timida Meyrick, 1914
Eulechria tolmera (Turner, 1941)
Eulechria triferella (Walker, 1864)
Eulechria vegrandis (Meyrick, 1884)
Eulechria xanthophylla Turner, 1937
Eulechria xenomima (Meyrick, 1913)
Eulechria xeropterella Common, 1996
Eulechria xuthophylla Turner, 1937
Eulechria xuthoptila Turner, 1938
Eulechria zophoptera Turner, 1938
Eulechria zoropa Turner, 1938
Hoplostega ochroma (Meyrick, 1886)
Pachybela argocentra (Lower, 1901)
Pachybela cremnodisema (Lower, 1897)
Pachybela crustulata (Meyrick, 1913)
Pachybela eremica Turner, 1917
Pachybela eurypolia Turner, 1939
Pachybela leporina (Meyrick, 1914)
Pachybela maculisarca (Lower, 1915)
Pachybela oncera (Turner, 1941)
Pachybela parisa Turner, 1917
Pachybela peloma (Lower, 1900)
Pachybela sarcosma (Lower, 1896)
Pachybela tetraspora (Lower, 1900)
Petalanthes diploxantha Meyrick, 1914
Petalanthes hexastera Meyrick, 1883
Petalanthes microphrica Turner, 1935
Petalanthes periclyta Meyrick, 1883
Petalanthes sphaerophora Meyrick, 1883
Sclerocris acropenthes (Turner, 1939)
Sclerocris albipalpis (Turner, 1939)
Sclerocris amoebaea (Meyrick, 1889)
Sclerocris amphisema (Lower, 1907)
Sclerocris chalcoxantha (Meyrick, 1889)
Sclerocris chiastis (Meyrick, 1889)
Sclerocris comoxantha (Meyrick, 1889)
Sclerocris cremnodes (Meyrick, 1883)
Sclerocris crocinastis (Meyrick, 1889)
Sclerocris cyclodesma (Turner, 1938)
Sclerocris echidnias (Meyrick, 1889)
Sclerocris goniosticha (Turner, 1939)
Sclerocris gymnastica (Meyrick, 1920)
Sclerocris menodes (Meyrick, 1888)
Sclerocris nephelopa (Meyrick, 1883)
Sclerocris nomistis (Meyrick, 1889)
Sclerocris ochrosarca (Turner, 1938)
Sclerocris pithanodes (Meyrick, 1920)
Sclerocris styphlodes (Turner, 1946)
Sclerocris tetragona (Meyrick, 1889)
Sclerocris tetrasticha (Turner, 1944)
Sclerocris thetica (Turner, 1916)
Sclerocris thiodes (Turner, 1917)
Temnogyropa cedea (Turner, 1944)
Temnogyropa cosmozona (Turner, 1940)
Temnogyropa insolita (Turner, 1940)
Temnogyropa stenomorpha (Turner, 1940)
Exarsia paracycla (Lower, 1897)
Periallactis monostropha (Lower, 1897)
Oresitropha melanotypa Turner, 1927
Aspasiodes plectrantha (Meyrick, 1913)
Phloioletes diachorda (Turner, 1939)
Phloioletes spanioleuca (Turner, 1933)
Machetis aphrobola Meyrick, 1883
Machetis diamochla Turner, 1941
Machetis dicranotypa (Turner, 1935)
Machetis plagiozona Turner, 1917
Machetis versatrix Meyrick, 1914
Pyrgoptila serpentina Meyrick, 1889
Pyrgoptila zalotypa (Turner, 1935)
Sthenozancla plagiotypa (Turner, 1941)
Syscalma cleophanta Meyrick, 1922
Syscalma percara (Turner, 1940)
Syscalma prymnaea Meyrick, 1920
Syscalma stenoxantha Turner, 1940
Baioglossa anisopasta (Turner, 1935)
Casmara exculta (Meyrick, 1914)
Casmara regalis Diakonoff, 1966
Elaeonoma deltacostamela (Lower, 1896)
Eremnozona straminea (Turner, 1917)
Lasiocosma homalota (Meyrick, 1889)
Leimmatonca chromatica (Turner, 1935)
Leimmatonca dasylopha (Lower, 1920)
Leipochlida phaulostola (Turner, 1935)
Leipochlida spreta (Meyrick, 1920)
Meioglossa pentochra (Lower, 1894)
Mermeristis spodiaea (Meyrick, 1915)
Phriconyma lucifuga Meyrick, 1883
Thapsinotypa anthemodes (Meyrick, 1886)
Barea acalles (Turner, 1927)
Barea acritopis (Turner, 1917)
Barea acrocapna (Turner, 1938)
Barea adelosema (Lower, 1920)
Barea aeglitis (Turner, 1940)
Barea aleuropasta Turner, 1935
Barea anerasta Turner, 1916
Barea angusta Turner, 1935
Barea anisochroa (Turner, 1935)
Barea arrhythma (Turner, 1917)
Barea asbolaea (Meyrick, 1883)
Barea atmophora Turner, 1916
Barea basigramma (Turner, 1896)
Barea bathrochorda Turner, 1935
Barea bryochroa Turner, 1916
Barea bryopis Turner, 1935
Barea centropis (Meyrick, 1889)
Barea ceramodes Turner, 1935
Barea chloreis (Turner, 1914)
Barea chlorozona Lower, 1923
Barea codrella (R. Felder & Rogenhofer, 1875)
Barea coeliota Turner, 1935
Barea confusella (Walker, 1864)
Barea consignatella Walker, 1864
Barea crassipalpis Turner, 1935
Barea cratista Turner, 1935
Barea crypsicentra (Meyrick, 1914)
Barea crypsipyrrha (Turner, 1938)
Barea delophanes (Meyrick, 1889)
Barea desmophora (Meyrick, 1883)
Barea discincta (Meyrick, 1884)
Barea dryocoetes (Turner, 1939)
Barea ebenopa Turner, 1935
Barea eburnea (Turner, 1935)
Barea eclecta Turner, 1935
Barea epethistis (Meyrick, 1902)
Barea eucapnodes (Turner, 1896)
Barea euprepes (Turner, 1896)
Barea eusciasta (Turner, 1916)
Barea exarcha (Meyrick, 1883)
Barea fenicoma (Meyrick, 1914)
Barea fervescens (Turner, 1937)
Barea glaphyra Turner, 1935
Barea graphica Turner, 1935
Barea gypsomicta (Turner, 1937)
Barea helica (Meyrick, 1883)
Barea hylodroma Turner, 1916
Barea hyperarcha (Meyrick, 1889)
Barea illepida (Turner, 1927)
Barea inconcinna (Turner, 1927)
Barea indecorella (Walker, 1864)
Barea intricata (Turner, 1944)
Barea lamprota Lower, 1923
Barea leucocephala (Turner, 1896)
Barea limpida Turner, 1935
Barea lithoglypta (Meyrick, 1883)
Barea melanodelta (Meyrick, 1883)
Barea meridarcha (Meyrick, 1889)
Barea mesocentra (Meyrick, 1889)
Barea micropis (Meyrick, 1889)
Barea nicaea (Meyrick, 1902)
Barea nymphica Turner, 1916
Barea ochrospora Turner, 1935
Barea ombromorpha (Meyrick, 1920)
Barea omophaea (Turner, 1941)
Barea ophiosticha Turner, 1935
Barea orthoptila (Lower, 1901)
Barea panarcha (Turner, 1915)
Barea pasteodes (Turner, 1914)
Barea peisteria (Turner, 1937)
Barea periodica Meyrick, 1920
Barea phaeobrya Turner, 1935
Barea phaeomochla (Turner, 1938)
Barea phaulobrya Turner, 1935
Barea phoenochyta (Turner, 1927)
Barea pissina Turner, 1935
Barea placophora (Turner, 1947)
Barea platyochra Turner, 1935
Barea plesiosticta Turner, 1935
Barea poliobrya Turner, 1935
Barea polytypa (Turner, 1935)
Barea prepta Turner, 1935
Barea psathyropa (Turner, 1927)
Barea psologramma Turner, 1916
Barea ptochica (Turner, 1917)
Barea pyrora (Meyrick, 1914)
Barea sciaspila (Lower, 1904)
Barea semifixa Meyrick, 1915
Barea semocausta (Meyrick, 1883)
Barea sideritis Turner, 1935
Barea sphaeridias (Meyrick, 1914)
Barea subviridella (Turner, 1896)
Barea synchyta (Meyrick, 1883)
Barea tanyptila Turner, 1935
Barea trissosema (Turner, 1939)
Barea trizyga (Meyrick, 1914)
Barea turbatella (Walker, 1864)
Barea umbrosa (Meyrick, 1914)
Barea viduata (Meyrick, 1920)
Barea xanthocoma (Lower, 1897)
Barea xanthoptera Turner, 1935
Barea ypsilon Turner, 1935
Barea zeugmatophora Turner, 1935
Barea zophospila (Turner, 1944)
Barea zygophora (Meyrick, 1889)
Delophanes anthracephala (Lower, 1894)
Diocrogephyra rhodobapta (Turner, 1938)
Erythrobapta haemalea (Turner, 1916)
Erythrobapta picimacula (Turner, 1935)
Habrochlanis epiphaula (Meyrick, 1889)
Habrochlanis fragilis (Meyrick, 1914)
Habrochlanis poliocrana (Meyrick, 1886)
Ischnomorpha charierga (Meyrick, 1889)
Ischnomorpha idiotropa (Turner, 1936)
Ischnomorpha thrypticopa (Meyrick, 1902)
Liozancla holophaea Turner, 1919
Locheutis delopasta Turner, 1939
Locheutis myrophenges Turner, 1935
Locheutis philochora Meyrick, 1883
Macronemata elaphia Meyrick, 1883
Micramicta amolgaea (Turner, 1938)
Micramicta cephalanthes (Meyrick, 1888)
Micramicta citritis (Turner, 1935)
Micramicta crococephala (Turner, 1944)
Micramicta flaccida (Meyrick, 1913)
Ochyrolopha praecana (Meyrick, 1913)
Oncomerista ochrophaea (Meyrick, 1883)
Opsitycha squalidella (Meyrick, 1884)
Ozotrypetes atrispersa (Turner, 1916)
Ozotrypetes stenota (Meyrick, 1889)
Sphyrelata amotella (Walker, 1864)
Sphyrelata deltotypa (Turner, 1941)
Sphyrelata eudmeta (Turner, 1917)
Sphyrelata melanoleuca Meyrick, 1883
Sphyrelata mesoplaca (Turner, 1941)
Stenoptena icmaea (Meyrick, 1915)
Triacra doxastica (Meyrick, 1889)
Actenotis diasema (Turner, 1935)
Airogephyra amydrodes (Turner, 1937)
Airogephyra mochlonota (Turner, 1939)
Airogephyra ochrogramma (Turner, 1939)
Airogephyra ochronota (Turner, 1944)
Airogephyra ochrosticta (Turner, 1944)
Analcodes esharias (Meyrick, 1921)
Antiopala ebenospila Turner, 1917
Antiopala tephraea Meyrick, 1889
Atalopsis cerochyta (Turner, 1940)
Atalopsis costipuncta (Turner, 1940)
Atalopsis heniocha (Meyrick, 1886)
Atalopsis leptadelpha (Lower, 1920)
Atalopsis melanossa (Turner, 1940)
Catadoceta xanthostephana (Meyrick, 1888)
Cirrograpta sporadica Common, 2000
Cirromitra tetratherma (Lower, 1896)
Coelognatha physica (Meyrick, 1920)
Coelognatha xanthocephala (Lower, 1893)
Diaphanta abares (Turner, 1941)
Diaphanta adocima (Turner, 1935)
Diaphanta arenivaga (Meyrick, 1884)
Diaphanta eucryphaea (Turner, 1935)
Diaphanta fuliginosa (Turner, 1935)
Diaphanta litopis (Turner, 1936)
Diaphanta pleurospila (Turner, 1935)
Diaphanta silvicola (Turner, 1898)
Diaphanta tetraspila (Turner, 1935)
Diaphanta themerodes (Meyrick, 1902)
Dolopsis apathodes (Meyrick, 1914)
Dolopsis chalcophragma (Meyrick, 1889)
Dolopsis coenodes (Meyrick, 1889)
Dolopsis inferna (Lower, 1899)
Dolopsis oxysema (Lower, 1903)
Dolopsis perinyctis (Meyrick, 1889)
Dolopsis xenopis (Meyrick, 1889)
Dysthreneta lepta Turner, 1947
Echinognatha comorrhoa (Turner, 1938)
Echinognatha phanerosticta (Turner, 1933)
Echinognatha tanytricha (Turner, 1933)
Echinognatha trichoceros (Turner, 1933)
Enlopholepis mediolinea (Turner, 1938)
Ereiconastes amphidoxa (Meyrick, 1889)
Ereiconastes butyrea (Turner, 1935)
Ereiconastes torosema (Meyrick, 1889)
Eulachna dasyptera Meyrick, 1884
Eulachna droseropa Turner, 1940
Guestia balia (Turner, 1933)
Guestia chaetophora (Turner, 1933)
Guestia uniformis (Meyrick, 1886)
Hesperenoeca geraeopa (Meyrick, 1913)
Hesperenoeca germinalis (Meyrick, 1913)
Hesperenoeca leucostemma (Turner, 1941)
Hesperenoeca solaris (Meyrick, 1913)
Laxonoma abductella (Meyrick, 1884)
Laxonoma hololeuca (Meyrick, 1884)
Laxonoma leptostola (Meyrick, 1884)
Leprocosma callizona (Meyrick, 1884)
Leprocosma hoplophanes (Meyrick, 1889)
Leprocosma phormictis (Meyrick, 1913)
Leprocosma photodotis (Meyrick, 1889)
Leptocroca sanguinolenta Meyrick, 1886
Machaeritis aegrella Meyrick, 1886
Machaeritis apocrypha (Turner, 1914)
Machaeritis dystechna (Meyrick, 1889)
Machaeritis indocta (Meyrick, 1886)
Machaeritis myrodes Turner, 1944
Machaeritis parastatis Turner, 1940
Machaeritis pelinopa (Meyrick, 1902)
Machaeritis pleuromochla Turner, 1944
Machaeritis proseches Turner, 1940
Machaeritis xanthomitra Turner, 1940
Melanoima pentaspila (Lower, 1900)
Micropeteina dryinodes (Meyrick, 1889)
Neosigala hyperopta (Meyrick, 1889)
Neosigala lathraea (Turner, 1916)
Ochropolia aclita (Turner, 1938)
Ochropolia micrastis (Lower, 1900)
Oncolapara anarcha (Meyrick, 1889)
Pachyceraia ochromochla (Turner, 1938)
Pachyceraia torvella (Turner, 1938)
Protomacha chalcaspis Meyrick, 1884
Protomacha notia (Turner, 1941)
Protomacha ochrochalca Meyrick, 1889
Protomacha paralia Meyrick, 1913
Psarophorca olympias (Lower, 1899)
Psarophorca perigypsa (Lower, 1901)
Psarophorca tapinophanes (Turner, 1940)
Rhoecoceros pelomorpha Turner, 1940
Saropla amydropis Meyrick, 1889
Saropla ancistrotis Meyrick, 1889
Saropla caelatella Meyrick, 1884
Saropla consuetella (Walker, 1864)
Saropla harpactis Meyrick, 1889
Saropla philocala Meyrick, 1884
Saropla vanescens (Meyrick, 1915)
Saropla vernalis (Meyrick, 1884)
Saropla xanthocoma (Lower, 1899)
Scoliocheta ergatis (Meyrick, 1884)
Sympoecila antygota (Meyrick, 1914)
Sympoecila athletis (Meyrick, 1888)
Sympoecila callisceptra (Meyrick, 1888)
Sympoecila cholerodes (Meyrick, 1888)
Sympoecila delotypa (Turner, 1941)
Sympoecila diachorda (Turner, 1941)
Sympoecila epichrista (Turner, 1937)
Sympoecila euryptila (Turner, 1941)
Sympoecila gypsopleura (Turner, 1916)
Sympoecila halmopeda (Meyrick, 1888)
Sympoecila holocrossa (Meyrick, 1889)
Sympoecila hyperchlora (Meyrick, 1888)
Sympoecila leucophanes (Meyrick, 1883)
Sympoecila nepheloma (Lower, 1899)
Sympoecila ochrocirrha (Turner, 1927)
Sympoecila phaeosceptra (Meyrick, 1888)
Sympoecila picraula (Lower, 1920)
Sympoecila polybalia (Turner, 1938)
Sympoecila thrincotis (Meyrick, 1888)
Sympoecila tyroxantha (Meyrick, 1884)
Syncometes holopsamma (Turner, 1944)
Syncometes vilis (Turner, 1944)
Trinaconeura homogypsa Turner, 1933
Aglaodes chionoma Turner, 1898
Tisobarica eranna Turner, 1916
Tisobarica habromorpha Lower, 1923
Tisobarica hedanopa Turner, 1916
Tisobarica hemigenes (Meyrick, 1889)
Tisobarica jucundella Walker, 1864
Tisobarica larotypa Turner, 1916
Tisobarica pyrrhella (Turner, 1896)
Tisobarica thyteria (Meyrick, 1889)
Aeolocosma cycloxantha Meyrick, 1906
Aeolocosma iridozona Meyrick, 1880
Ancistroneura ammophara Turner, 1947
Ancistroneura thaumasia Turner, 1947
Chioneocephala ochroptera (Meyrick, 1884)
Clonitica eusarca (Meyrick, 1902)
Copidostola orthotis Lower, 1897
Corethropalpa melanoneura (Meyrick, 1884)
Corynotricha amalodes (Meyrick, 1889)
Corynotricha antipodella (Wallengren, 1861)
Corynotricha habrodes (Lower, 1899)
Corynotricha trimeris (Lower, 1902)
Crossophora semiota Meyrick, 1886
Diasceta aeolias (Meyrick, 1889)
Diasceta furtiva (Turner, 1940)
Diasceta phaeocosma (Meyrick, 1889)
Diasceta terpnopis (Turner, 1944)
Eridolera leucostephes (Turner, 1939)
Eridolera tenellula (Turner, 1939)
Joonggoora cunctilineata T. P. Lucas, 1901
Joonggoora tricollata T. P. Lucas, 1901
Leptocopa notoplecta Meyrick, 1918
Leurophanes oresibates Turner, 1939
Lonchoptena episcota (Meyrick, 1889)
Metaphrastis acrochalca Meyrick, 1907
Metaphrastis corusca (Turner, 1935)
Microlocha entypa Meyrick, 1914
Mimobrachyoma basileuca (Turner, 1933)
Mimobrachyoma campylosema (Turner, 1944)
Mimobrachyoma cosmanthes (Meyrick, 1889)
Mimobrachyoma eusema (Lower, 1900)
Mimobrachyoma gonosema (Meyrick, 1888)
Mimobrachyoma hilaropa (Meyrick, 1889)
Mimobrachyoma lychnosema (Meyrick, 1886)
Mimobrachyoma maculifera (Lower, 1899)
Mimobrachyoma meselectra (Meyrick, 1902)
Mimobrachyoma ophthalmias (Meyrick, 1888)
Mimobrachyoma optalea (Meyrick, 1902)
Mimobrachyoma protadelpha (Meyrick, 1889)
Mimobrachyoma pseudopis (Meyrick, 1920)
Mimobrachyoma sulfurea (Meyrick, 1886)
Nemepeira basatra (Lower, 1900)
Nemepeira centrotherma (Lower, 1901)
Nemepeira punicea (Turner, 1938)
Nemepeira pyrocentra (Lower, 1897)
Ochlogenes advectella Walker, 1864
Oenochroa atradelpha (Lower, 1903)
Oenochroa cimmeriella (Meyrick, 1883)
Oenochroa cosmosticha (Turner, 1937)
Oenochroa dinosema Meyrick, 1889
Oenochroa dystena Turner, 1935
Oenochroa egregia (Turner, 1937)
Oenochroa endochlora Meyrick, 1883
Oenochroa epiconia (Turner, 1936)
Oenochroa gnophodes Turner, 1896
Oenochroa homora Meyrick, 1902
Oenochroa iobaphes Meyrick, 1883
Oenochroa lactella (Walker, 1864)
Oenochroa lechriomochla (Turner, 1933)
Oenochroa lepida Turner, 1935
Oenochroa mesozona (Lower, 1903)
Oenochroa molybdoptera Turner, 1935
Oenochroa ochrosoma Turner, 1896
Oenochroa phaeobaphes (Turner, 1933)
Oenochroa picimacula (Turner, 1938)
Oenochroa serrulifera (Turner, 1933)
Oenochroa suffulva Turner, 1935
Oenochroa tacita (Turner, 1927)
Oenochroa thermistis (Lower, 1896)
Orescoa orites (Turner, 1941)
Orescoa paurogramma (Meyrick, 1883)
Pauronota thermaloma Lower, 1901
Pholeutis aprepta Turner, 1947
Pholeutis holoxytha Meyrick, 1915
Pholeutis leucoprepta Turner, 1947
Pholeutis neolecta Meyrick, 1906
Pholeutis suffusca (Turner, 1919)
Phyzanica pelogenes (Meyrick, 1906)
Phyzanica tapinopa Turner, 1917
Teerahna regifica T. P. Lucas, 1901
Trachyxysta antichroma Meyrick, 1902
Woorda aquosa T. P. Lucas, 1901
Wullaburra nigromedia T. P. Lucas, 1901

The following species belongs to the subfamily Praydinae, but have not been assigned to a genus yet. Given here is the original name given to the species when it was first described:
Philobota carinaria Meyrick, 1913
Eulechria celata Meyrick, 1913
Eulechria centroleuca Turner, 1938
Saropla glagoessa Turner, 1944
Philobota hemeris Meyrick, 1915
Coesyra hemiphragma Meyrick, 1889
Saropla hemixantha Turner, 1939
Machimia homopolia Turner, 1946
Eulechria homoteles Meyrick, 1888
Philobota isomora Turner, 1915
Chezala liopa Turner, 1927
Eulechria pelina Turner, 1938
Eulechria pelodora Meyrick, 1888
Eulechria sciaphila Turner, 1927
Eulechria tanysticha Turner, 1937

Stathmopodinae
Actinoscelis astricta Turner, 1923
Aeoloscelis chrysophoenicea Meyrick, 1897
Aeoloscelis hipparcha Meyrick, 1897
Aeoloscelis pachyceros Turner, 1941
Aeoloscelis sphragidota Meyrick, 1897
Aeoloscelis thiostola Turner, 1923
Calicotis crucifera Meyrick, 1889
Calicotis microgalopsis Lower, 1904
Calicotis sialota Turner, 1917
Calicotis triploesta Turner, 1923
Coracistis erythrocosma Meyrick, 1897
Dolophrosynella balteata (Durrant, 1919)
Ethirastis sideraula (Meyrick, 1915)
Hieromantis albata (Meyrick, 1913)
Hieromantis ephodophora Meyrick, 1897
Idioglossa metallochrysa Turner, 1917
Molybdurga metallophora Meyrick, 1897
Mylocera tenebrifera Turner, 1898
Pachyrhabda acroscia Turner, 1941
Pachyrhabda adela Turner, 1923
Pachyrhabda antinoma Meyrick, 1910
Pachyrhabda argyritis Turner, 1941
Pachyrhabda bacterias Meyrick, 1913
Pachyrhabda campylosticha Turner, 1941
Pachyrhabda capnoscia Turner, 1923
Pachyrhabda hygrophaes Turner, 1923
Pachyrhabda liriopis Turner, 1941
Pachyrhabda punctifera Turner, 1941
Pachyrhabda steropodes Meyrick, 1897
Pachyrhabda xanthoscia Turner, 1923
Pseudaegeria hyalina Turner, 1913
Pseudaegeria phlogina Turner, 1941
Pseudaegeria polytita Turner, 1913
Pseudaegeria squamicornis (R. Felder & Rogenhofer, 1875)
Snellenia capnora Turner, 1913
Snellenia flavipennis (R. Felder & Rogenhofer, 1875)
Snellenia hylaea Turner, 1913
Snellenia lineata (Walker, 1856)
Snellenia miltocrossa Turner, 1923
Stathmopoda acontias Meyrick, 1897
Stathmopoda amathodes Turner, 1941
Stathmopoda aphanosema Turner, 1923
Stathmopoda arachnophthora Turner, 1917
Stathmopoda astrapeis Meyrick, 1897
Stathmopoda basixantha Turner, 1917
Stathmopoda bathrodelta Meyrick, 1921
Stathmopoda callichrysa Lower, 1893
Stathmopoda canonica Meyrick, 1897
Stathmopoda castanodes Turner, 1941
Stathmopoda cephalaea Meyrick, 1897
Stathmopoda ceramoptila Turner, 1923
Stathmopoda chalcotypa Meyrick, 1897
Stathmopoda chalybeis Meyrick, 1897
Stathmopoda citroptila Turner, 1941
Stathmopoda crocophanes Meyrick, 1897
Stathmopoda cyanopla Meyrick, 1897
Stathmopoda desmoteles Meyrick, 1897
Stathmopoda diclidias Meyrick, 1921
Stathmopoda dimochla Turner, 1941
Stathmopoda doratias Meyrick, 1897
Stathmopoda effossa Meyrick, 1921
Stathmopoda euzona (Turner, 1926)
Stathmopoda grammatopis Meyrick, 1921
Stathmopoda holobapta Lower, 1904
Stathmopoda hyposcia Meyrick, 1897
Stathmopoda iodes Meyrick, 1897
Stathmopoda ischnotis Meyrick, 1897
Stathmopoda isoclera (Meyrick, 1897)
Stathmopoda lethonoa Meyrick, 1897
Stathmopoda liporrhoa Meyrick, 1897
Stathmopoda mannophora Turner, 1900
Stathmopoda marmarosticha Turner, 1941
Stathmopoda megathyma Meyrick, 1897
Stathmopoda melanochra Meyrick, 1897
Stathmopoda mesombra Meyrick, 1897
Stathmopoda metopias Meyrick, 1920
Stathmopoda mimantha Meyrick, 1913
Stathmopoda nephocentra Meyrick, 1921
Stathmopoda nitida Meyrick, 1913
Stathmopoda notosticha Turner, 1941
Stathmopoda nympheuteria Turner, 1941
Stathmopoda ochrochyta (Turner, 1926)
Stathmopoda pampolia Turner, 1923
Stathmopoda pantarches Meyrick, 1897
Stathmopoda platynipha Turner, 1923
Stathmopoda ptycholampra Turner, 1941
Stathmopoda recondita Turner, 1941
Stathmopoda rhodocosma Turner, 1941
Stathmopoda rhythmota Meyrick, 1920
Stathmopoda rubripicta Meyrick, 1921
Stathmopoda sentica (Lower, 1899)
Stathmopoda sphendonita Meyrick, 1921
Stathmopoda trichopeda Lower, 1904
Stathmopoda trifida Meyrick, 1921
Stathmopoda trimochla Turner, 1941
Stathmopoda triselena Meyrick, 1897
Stathmopoda tritophaea Turner, 1917
Stathmopoda xanthocrana Turner, 1933
Stathmopoda xanthoma Meyrick, 1897
Stathmopoda zalodes Meyrick, 1913
Stathmopoda zophoptila Turner, 1941
Trychnopepla discors Turner, 1941
Zatrichodes horrifica Meyrick, 1922

Xyloryctinae
Araeostoma aenicta Turner, 1917
Arignota stercorata (T.P. Lucas, 1894)
Athrotaxivora tasmanica McQuillan, 1998
Bassarodes siriaca Meyrick, 1910
Bathydoxa euxesta Turner, 1935
Bida radiosella (Walker, 1863)
Boydia criniferella Newman, 1856
Boydia stenadelpha (Lower, 1905)
Brachybelistis blackburnii (Lower, 1892)
Brachybelistis neomorpha (Turner, 1898)
Brachybelistis pentachroa (Lower, 1901)
Catoryctis eugramma Meyrick, 1890
Catoryctis leucomerata (Lower, 1893)
Catoryctis mediolinea T.P. Lucas, 1894
Catoryctis nonolinea T.P. Lucas, 1894
Catoryctis perichalca Lower, 1923
Catoryctis polysticha Lower, 1893
Catoryctis sciastis (Meyrick, 1915)
Catoryctis subnexella (Walker, 1864)
Catoryctis subparallela (Walker, 1864)
Catoryctis tricrena Meyrick, 1890
Catoryctis truncata T.P. Lucas, 1902
Chalarotona craspedota Meyrick, 1890
Chalarotona insincera Meyrick, 1890
Chalarotona intabescens Meyrick, 1890
Chalarotona melipnoa Meyrick, 1890
Chalarotona melitoleuca Meyrick, 1890
Chereuta anthracistis Meyrick, 1906
Chereuta chalcistis Meyrick, 1906
Chereuta tinthalea Meyrick, 1906
Clerarcha agana Meyrick, 1890
Clerarcha dryinopa Meyrick, 1890
Clerarcha grammatistis Meyrick, 1890
Clerarcha poliochyta Turner, 1902
Compsotorna eccrita Turner, 1917
Compsotorna oligarchica Meyrick, 1890
Copidoris dimorpha Meyrick, 1907
Crypsicharis enthetica Meyrick, 1922
Crypsicharis neocosma Meyrick, 1890
Crypsicharis triplaca Lower, 1923
Cryptophasa aglaodes (Lower, 1893)
Cryptophasa albacosta Lewin, 1805
Cryptophasa alphitodes Turner, 1904
Cryptophasa argyrias Turner, 1906
Cryptophasa argyrocolla Turner, 1917
Cryptophasa atecmarta Turner, 1917
Cryptophasa balteata (Walker, 1866)
Cryptophasa bipunctata Scott, 1864
Cryptophasa blosyra Turner, 1917
Cryptophasa byssinopis Turner, 1902
Cryptophasa cannea (T.P. Lucas, 1901)
Cryptophasa catharia Turner, 1917
Cryptophasa chionodes (Turner, 1898)
Cryptophasa citrinopa (Lower, 1915)
Cryptophasa delocentra (Meyrick, 1890)
Cryptophasa diplosema (Lower, 1903)
Cryptophasa ensigera Meyrick, 1925
Cryptophasa epadelpha (Meyrick, 1890)
Cryptophasa epixysta Turner, 1917
Cryptophasa eumorpha (Turner, 1898)
Cryptophasa flavolineata (Walker, 1864)
Cryptophasa gypsomera (Lower, 1903)
Cryptophasa hyalinopa (Lower, 1901)
Cryptophasa immaculata Scott, 1864
Cryptophasa insana (R. Felder & Rogenhofer, 1875)
Cryptophasa irrorata Lewin, 1805
Cryptophasa isoneura (Lower, 1902)
Cryptophasa lasiocosma (Lower, 1908)
Cryptophasa leucadelpha Meyrick, 1887
Cryptophasa melanoscia (Lower, 1903)
Cryptophasa molaris (T.P. Lucas, 1900)
Cryptophasa nephrosema (Turner, 1898)
Cryptophasa nigricincta (Turner, 1898)
Cryptophasa nubila (T.P. Lucas, 1894)
Cryptophasa ochroleuca (Lower, 1892)
Cryptophasa opalina (Turner, 1900)
Cryptophasa panleuca (Lower, 1901)
Cryptophasa phaeochtha Meyrick, 1925
Cryptophasa phaethontia (Meyrick, 1890)
Cryptophasa phycidoides (T.P. Lucas, 1901)
Cryptophasa platypedimela (Lower, 1894)
Cryptophasa porphyritis Turner, 1906
Cryptophasa psilocrossa Turner, 1902
Cryptophasa pultenae Lewin, 1805
Cryptophasa rubescens Lewin, 1805
Cryptophasa rubra (Meyrick, 1890)
Cryptophasa russata Butler, 1877
Cryptophasa sacerdos Turner, 1902
Cryptophasa sarcinota (Meyrick, 1890)
Cryptophasa sceliphrodes Meyrick, 1925
Cryptophasa spilonota Scott, 1864
Cryptophasa stenoleuca (Lower, 1894)
Cryptophasa stochastis (Meyrick, 1890)
Cryptophasa tecta (T.P. Lucas, 1894)
Cryptophasa tetrazona (Lower, 1901)
Cryptophasa themerodes Turner, 1904
Cryptophasa xylomima Turner, 1906
Cryptophasa zorodes Turner, 1917
Echiomima fabulosa Meyrick, 1915
Echiomima mythica (Meyrick, 1890)
Echiomima viperina Meyrick, 1915
Eporycta hiracopis Meyrick, 1921
Eschatura lactea (Turner, 1898)
Eschatura lemurias Meyrick, 1897
Gomphoscopa catoryctopsis (Lower, 1893)
Gonioma hospita (R. Felder & Rogenhofer, 1875)
Gonioma hypoxantha (Lower, 1894)
Heterochyta aprepta (Turner, 1947)
Heterochyta asteropa Meyrick, 1906
Heterochyta infesta (Meyrick, 1921)
Heterochyta pyrotypa Common, 1996
Heterochyta tetracentra (Meyrick, 1906)
Heterochyta xenomorpha Meyrick, 1906
Hylypnes isosticha (Meyrick, 1915)
Hylypnes leptosticta (Turner, 1947)
Hylypnes pudica (Lower, 1896)
Illidgea aethalodes Turner, 1902
Illidgea epigramma (Meyrick, 1890)
Iulactis insignis (Meyrick, 1904)
Iulactis semifusca Meyrick, 1918
Leistarcha amphigramma (Meyrick, 1915)
Leistarcha scitissimella (Walker, 1864)
Leistarcha tenuistria (Turner, 1935)
Leistarcha thaumastica (Turner, 1946)
Leptobelistis asemanta Turner, 1902
Leptobelistis isthmodes (Meyrick, 1922)
Lichenaula afflictella (Walker, 1864)
Lichenaula appropinquans T.P. Lucas, 1901
Lichenaula arisema Meyrick, 1890
Lichenaula calligrapha Meyrick, 1890
Lichenaula callispora Turner, 1904
Lichenaula choriodes Meyrick, 1890
Lichenaula circumsignata T.P. Lucas, 1900
Lichenaula comparella (Walker, 1864)
Lichenaula drosias Lower, 1899
Lichenaula fumata Turner, 1898
Lichenaula goniodes Turner, 1898
Lichenaula ignota Turner, 1898
Lichenaula laniata Meyrick, 1890
Lichenaula lichenea Meyrick, 1890
Lichenaula lithina Meyrick, 1890
Lichenaula maculosa (Turner, 1898)
Lichenaula melanoleuca Turner, 1898
Lichenaula mochlias Meyrick, 1890
Lichenaula musica Meyrick, 1890
Lichenaula onychodes Turner, 1898
Lichenaula onychotypa Turner, 1939
Lichenaula pelodesma (Lower, 1899)
Lichenaula petulans T.P. Lucas, 1900
Lichenaula phloeochroa Turner, 1898
Lichenaula selenophora Lower, 1892
Lichenaula tholodes Turner, 1900
Lichenaula tortriciformis T.P. Lucas, 1900
Lichenaula tuberculata Meyrick, 1890
Lichenaula undulatella (Walker, 1864)
Liparistis lioxera Meyrick, 1915
Liparistis monosema (Lower, 1893)
Lophobela sinuosa Turner, 1917
Maroga leptopasta Turner, 1917
Maroga melanostigma (Wallengren, 1861)
Maroga paragypsa Lower, 1901
Maroga sericodes Meyrick, 1915
Maroga setiotricha Meyrick, 1890
Paralecta tinctoria (T.P. Lucas, 1894)
Perixestis eucephala (Turner, 1902)
Perixestis rhizophaga (Turner, 1902)
Philarista porphyrinella (Walker, 1864)
Phthonerodes peridela Common, 1964
Phthonerodes scotarcha Meyrick, 1890
Pilostibes basivitta (Walker, 1864)
Pilostibes embroneta Turner, 1902
Pilostibes serpta T.P. Lucas, 1901
Pilostibes stigmatias Meyrick, 1890
Plectophila acrochroa (Turner, 1900)
Plectophila discalis (Walker, 1865)
Plectophila electella (Walker, 1864)
Plectophila eucrines (Turner, 1898)
Plectophila micradelpha (Turner, 1898)
Plectophila placocosma Lower, 1893
Plectophila pyrgodes Turner, 1898
Plectophila sarculata T.P. Lucas, 1901
Plectophila thiophanes (Turner, 1917)
Plectophila thrasycosma (Meyrick, 1915)
Potniarcha hierastis (Meyrick, 1890)
Scieropepla acrates Meyrick, 1890
Scieropepla argoloma Lower, 1897
Scieropepla ceramochroa (Turner, 1919)
Scieropepla hapalyntis (Meyrick, 1911)
Scieropepla liophanes Meyrick, 1890
Scieropepla megadelpha Lower, 1899
Scieropepla monoides Turner, 1906
Scieropepla obfuscata (Meyrick, 1921)
Scieropepla orthosema (Lower, 1893)
Scieropepla oxyptera Meyrick, 1890
Scieropepla photinodes Lower, 1897
Scieropepla polioleuca (Turner, 1919)
Scieropepla polyxesta Meyrick, 1890
Scieropepla reversella (Walker, 1864)
Scieropepla rimata Meyrick, 1890
Scieropepla serica (Turner, 1944)
Scieropepla serina Meyrick, 1890
Scieropepla trinervis (Meyrick, 1904)
Scieropepla typhicola Meyrick, 1885
Sphalerostola epierana (Turner, 1947)
Telecrates basileia (Turner, 1902)
Telecrates desmochrysa Lower, 1896
Telecrates laetiorella (Walker, 1864)
Telecrates melanochrysa (Turner, 1939)
Thymiatris allocrossa (Turner, 1902)
Thymiatris cephalochra (Lower, 1894)
Thysiarcha ecclesiastis (Meyrick, 1887)
Tymbophora peltastis Meyrick, 1890
Uzucha borealis Turner, 1898
Uzucha humeralis Walker, 1864
Xerocrates proleuca (Meyrick, 1890)
Xylodryadella cryeranthes (Meyrick, 1925)
Xylomimetes scholastis Turner, 1916
Xylomimetes trachyptera (Turner, 1900)
Xylorycta amaloptis Lower, 1915
Xylorycta amblygona (Turner, 1900)
Xylorycta amphileuca Lower, 1902
Xylorycta apheles (Turner, 1898)
Xylorycta argentella (Walker, 1864)
Xylorycta argyrota Lower, 1908
Xylorycta assimilis Turner, 1900
Xylorycta austera T.P. Lucas, 1898
Xylorycta bipunctella (Walker, 1864)
Xylorycta calligramma (Meyrick, 1890)
Xylorycta candescens Lower, 1896
Xylorycta castanea (Turner, 1902)
Xylorycta ceratospila Meyrick, 1915
Xylorycta chionoptera Lower, 1893
Xylorycta chrysomela Lower, 1897
Xylorycta cirrhophragma Meyrick, 1921
Xylorycta conistica Turner, 1917
Xylorycta corticana T.P. Lucas, 1901
Xylorycta cosmeta Turner, 1917
Xylorycta cosmopis Meyrick, 1890
Xylorycta cygnella (Walker, 1864)
Xylorycta emarginata (T.P. Lucas, 1900)
Xylorycta flavicosta (T.P. Lucas, 1894)
Xylorycta haplochroa (Turner, 1898)
Xylorycta heliomacula (Lower, 1894)
Xylorycta homoleuca Lower, 1894
Xylorycta leucophanes Lower, 1892
Xylorycta luteotactella (Walker, 1864)
Xylorycta maeandria Meyrick, 1915
Xylorycta melaleucae Turner, 1898
Xylorycta melanias Lower, 1899
Xylorycta melanula (Meyrick, 1890)
Xylorycta micracma (Meyrick, 1890)
Xylorycta moligera (Meyrick, 1914)
Xylorycta molybdina Turner, 1898
Xylorycta nivella (Walker, 1864)
Xylorycta ophiogramma Meyrick, 1890
Xylorycta orectis Meyrick, 1890
Xylorycta parabolella (Walker, 1864)
Xylorycta parthenistis Lower, 1902
Xylorycta perflua Meyrick, 1914
Xylorycta philonympha Lower, 1903
Xylorycta placidella (Walker, 1864)
Xylorycta polysticha Turner, 1939
Xylorycta sigmophora Lower, 1894
Xylorycta stereodesma Lower, 1902
Xylorycta streptogramma (Lower, 1903)
Xylorycta strigata (Lewin, 1805)
Xylorycta sucina Turner, 1939
Xylorycta synaula Meyrick, 1890
Xylorycta tapeina Turner, 1898
Xylorycta tignaria Meyrick, 1921
Zaphanaula hemileuca (Turner, 1896)
Zauclophora pelodes Turner, 1900
Zauclophora procellosa (T.P. Lucas, 1901)

Stenomatinae
Agriophara atratella (Walker, 1866)
Agriophara axesta Meyrick, 1890
Agriophara capnodes Meyrick, 1890
Agriophara cinderella (Newman, 1856)
Agriophara cinerosa Rosenstock, 1885
Agriophara confertella (Walker, 1864)
Agriophara cremnopis Lower, 1894
Agriophara curta T.P. Lucas, 1900
Agriophara diminuta Rosenstock, 1885
Agriophara discobola Turner, 1898
Agriophara dyscapna Turner, 1917
Agriophara fascifera Meyrick, 1890
Agriophara gravis Meyrick, 1890
Agriophara horridula Meyrick, 1890
Agriophara hyalinota Lower, 1899
Agriophara leptosemela Lower, 1893
Agriophara leucanthes Turner, 1898
Agriophara leucosta Lower, 1893
Agriophara levis Meyrick, 1921
Agriophara murinella (Walker, 1864)
Agriophara neoxanta Meyrick, 1915
Agriophara nodigera Turner, 1900
Agriophara plagiosema Turner, 1898
Agriophara platyscia Lower, 1908
Agriophara poliopepla Turner, 1898
Agriophara polistis (Lower, 1923)
Agriophara tephroptera Lower, 1903
Agriophara velitata (T.P. Lucas, 1900)
Aproopta melanchlaena Turner, 1919
Eriogenes cossoides (Butler, 1882)
Eriogenes mesogypsa Meyrick, 1925
Eriogenes nielseni Edwards, 2003
Phylomictis decretoria T.P. Lucas, 1900
Phylomictis eclecta Turner, 1906
Phylomictis idiotricha Meyrick, 1921
Phylomictis leucopelta (Lower, 1902)
Phylomictis lintearia Meyrick, 1921
Phylomictis maligna Meyrick, 1890
Phylomictis monochroma Lower, 1892
Phylomictis palaeomorpha Turner, 1898
Phylomictis sarcinopa Meyrick, 1920

Autostichinae
Anaptilora basiphaea Turner, 1919
Anaptilora ephelotis Meyrick, 1916
Anaptilora eremias Meyrick, 1904
Anaptilora haplospila Turner, 1919
Anaptilora homoclera Meyrick, 1916
Anaptilora isocosma Meyrick, 1904
Anaptilora parasira Meyrick, 1916
Autosticha symmetra (Turner, 1919)
Procometis aplegiopa Turner, 1904
Procometis bisulcata Meyrick, 1890
Procometis coniochersa Meyrick, 1922
Procometis diplocentra Meyrick, 1890
Procometis genialis Meyrick, 1890
Procometis hylonoma Meyrick, 1890
Procometis lipara Meyrick, 1890
Procometis melanthes Turner, 1898
Procometis monocalama Meyrick, 1890
Procometis periscia Lower, 1903
Procometis phloeodes Turner, 1898
Procometis stenarga Turner, 1902
Syndesmica homogenes Turner, 1919
Trichloma asbolophora Lower, 1902

Unplaced to Subfamily
Callithauma basilica Turner, 1900
Callithauma callianthes (Meyrick, 1889)
Callithauma glycera Turner, 1916
Callithauma leptodoma Turner, 1916
Callithauma miniatula Turner, 1946
Callithauma pyrites (Turner, 1896)
Pytinaea anticrossa (Meyrick, 1915)
Pytinaea pytinaea (Meyrick, 1902)
Pytinaea schistopa (Meyrick, 1902)
Sphaleropis adelphodes (Lower, 1893)
Sphaleropis sphaleropis (Meyrick, 1902)

External links 
Oecophoridae at the Australian Faunal Directory

Australia
Oecophoridae